= 1545 =

1545 in various calendars
- Gregorian calendar: 1545; MDXLV
- Ab urbe condita: 2298
- Armenian calendar: 994; ԹՎ ՋՂԴ
- Assyrian calendar: 6295
- Balinese saka calendar: 1466–1467
- Bengali calendar: 951–952
- Berber calendar: 2495
- English Regnal year: 36 Hen. 8 – 37 Hen. 8
- Buddhist calendar: 2089
- Burmese calendar: 907
- Byzantine calendar: 7053–7054
- Chinese calendar: 甲辰年 (Wood Dragon); 4242 or 4035 — to — 乙巳年 (Wood Snake); 4243 or 4036
- Coptic calendar: 1261–1262
- Discordian calendar: 2711
- Ethiopian calendar: 1537–1538
- Hebrew calendar: 5305–5306
- Hindu calendars
- Vikram Samvat: 1601–1602
- Shaka Samvat: 1466–1467
- Kali Yuga: 4645–4646
- Holocene calendar: 11545
- Igbo calendar: 545–546
- Iranian calendar: 923–924
- Islamic calendar: 951–952
- Japanese calendar: Tenbun 14 (天文１４年)
- Javanese calendar: 1463–1464
- Julian calendar: 1545; MDXLV
- Korean calendar: 3878
- Minguo calendar: 367 before ROC 民前367年
- Nanakshahi calendar: 77
- Thai solar calendar: 2087–2088
- Tibetan calendar: ཤིང་ཕོ་འབྲུག་ལོ་ (male Wood-Dragon); 1671 or 1290 or 518 — to — ཤིང་མོ་སྦྲུལ་ལོ་ (female Wood-Snake); 1672 or 1291 or 519

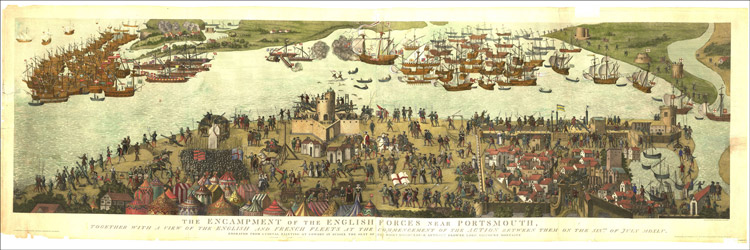
July 18 – July 19: The Battle of the Solent ends with the sinking of the English flagship Mary Rose.

Year 1545 (MDXLV) was a common year starting on Thursday of the Julian calendar.

== Events ==
=== January–March ===
- January 1 – King Francis I of France issues the "Arrêt de Mérindol", to destroy the Protestant Waldensians of Provence.
- January 4 – Giovanni Battista De Fornari begins a 2-year term as the Doge of Genoa, succeeding Andrea Centurione Pietrasanta.
- February 22 – A firman of the Ottoman Empire is issued for the dethronement of Radu Paisie as Prince of Wallachia.
- February 27 – Battle of Ancrum Moor: The Scots are victorious over numerically superior English forces.
- March 17 – Mircea the Shepherd enters Bucharest as the new ruler of Wallachia, now in Romania.
- March 24 – At a diet in Worms, Germany, summoned by Pope Paul III, the German Protestant princes demand a national religious settlement for Germany. Holy Roman Emperor, Charles V refuses.

=== April–June ===
- April 1 – Potosí is founded by the Spanish as a mining town after the discovery of huge silver deposits in this area of modern-day Bolivia. Silver mined from Huayna Potosí Mountain provides most of the wealth on which the Spanish Empire is based until its fall in the early 19th century.
- May 4 – Hundred Years' Croatian–Ottoman War: Battle of Konjščina – In an attempt to prevent arson and looting of the Otomans, Croatian troops attacked them, but were force to retreat
- May 20 –
  - Sher Shah Suri, King of the Sur Empire in northern India, is fatally injured by an explosion from one of his own cannons while leading the siege of the Kalinjar Fort and dies two days later.
  - In Vietnam, warlord Nguyễn Kim of the Lê dynasty leads troops toward an attack on Ninh Binh when he is invited by Dương Chấp Nhất of the Mạc dynasty to dinner. General Kim is treated to a watermelon by Duong and dies the next day.
- May 27 – Prince Jalal Khan, the second son of the late Sher Shah Suri, is crowned as the new King of the Suri Empire and takes the regnal name of Islam Shah Suri.
- May 31 – During the Italian War, a French expeditionary force under the direction of Claude d'Annebault begins an invasion of Britain by landing in Scotland.
- June 13 – Spanish explorer Yñigo Ortiz de Retez sets out to navigate the northern coast of New Guinea.
- June 20 – Spanish explorer Yñigo Ortiz de Retez arrives at a large island in the South Pacific Ocean. Stopping at the Mamberamo River, Ortiz claims the island for Spain and christens it "Nueva Guinea" after concluding that the natives resemble the people on the coast of the Guinea coast of West Africa.

=== July–September ===
- July 18– The Battle of the Solent begins between the English and French navies in The Solent, the strait between the British mainland and the Isle of Wight.
- July 19 – The Royal Navy's flagship, the Mary Rose, is sunk along with 365 of its 400 crew before the Battle of the Solent ends inconclusively. The wreckage will be located in 1971, more than 400 years after the sinking, and raised on October 11, 1982.
- July 21 – Italian Wars: Battle of Bonchurch – The English reverse an attempted French invasion of the Isle of Wight, off the coast of England.
- August 5 – Scottish nobleman Domhnall Dubh, also called "Black Donald", secures an alliance with King Henry VIII of England and plans an invasion of Scotland (Dubh's Rebellion) seeking to install the Earl of Lennox as the regent for Mary, Queen of Scots, rather than the incumbent Regent Arran. The rebellion attracts little support from other nobles and Dubh dies of a fever while in Ireland, before an invasion can take place.
- August 8 – King Injong of Joseon, ruler of the Korean Empire, dies at the age of 30, after only eight months as monarch. His allies suspect that he had slowly been poisoned by his stepmother, Queen Janggyeong, who had been Queen consort as the wife of King Jungjong. Queen Janggyeong's 12-year-old son Myeongjong is enthroned as the new King, with Janggyeong as the regent.

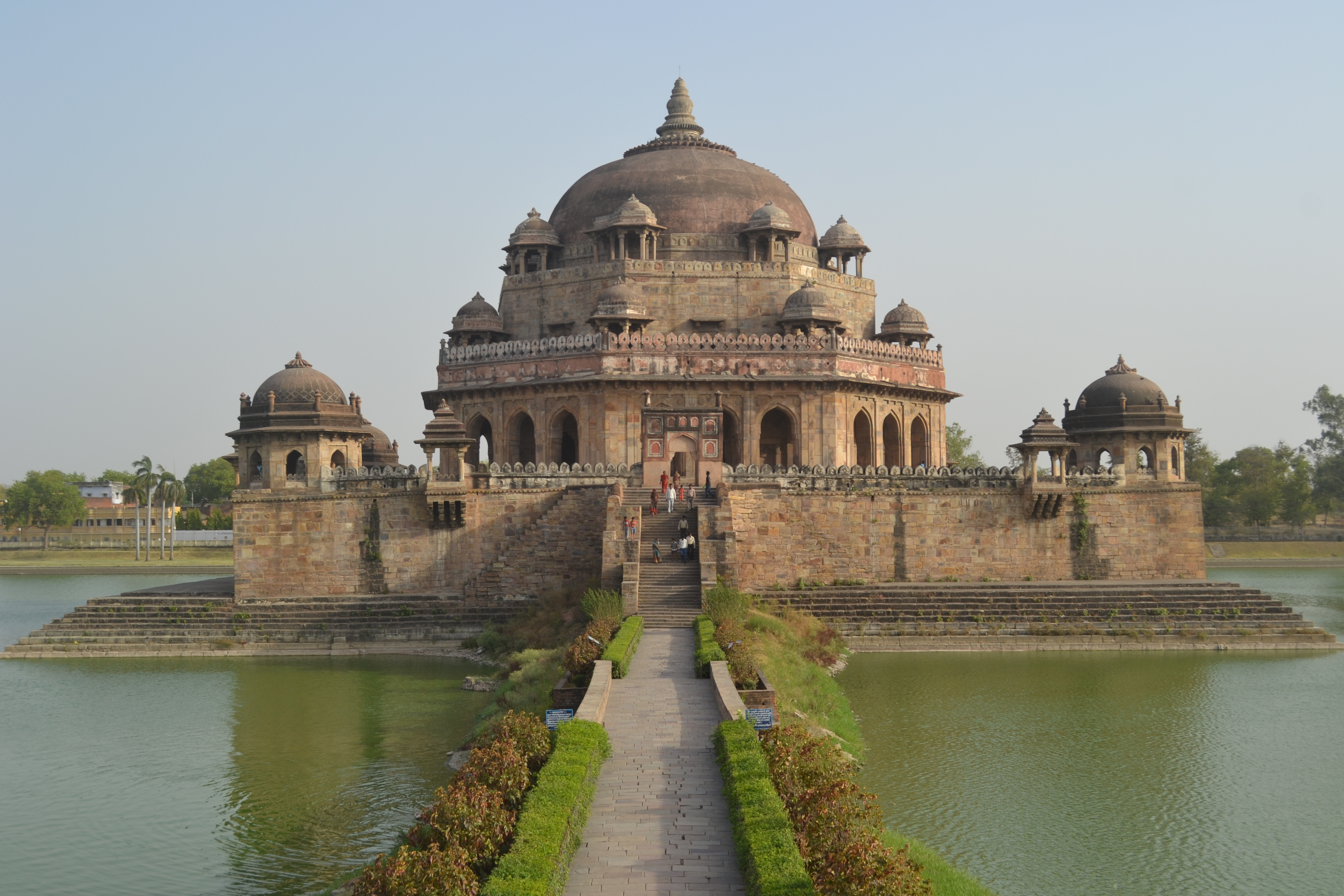
Sher Shah's tomb

- August 16 – The elaborate Tomb of Sher Shah Suri is completed in Sasaram, three months after Sher Shah's death, in what is now India's Bihar state.
- September 16 –
  - The Duchy of Parma and Piacenza is created in Italy by order of Pope Paul III, formerly Alessandro Farnese, to be ruled by his son, Pier Luigi Farnese.
  - In a one-day campaign in the Rough Wooing border war between England and Scotland, the English generals Lord Hertford and Robert Bowes carry out a mission of burning Scottish towns along the River Teviot. He writes later that with 1,500 light horsemen from 5:00 in the morning to 3:00 in the afternoon, his army "burnt 14 or 15 towns" including "Rowle, Spittel, Bedrowle, Rowlewood, The Wolles, Crossebewghe, Donnerles, Fotton, West Leas, Troonyhill, and Dupligi.
- c. September – Mobye Narapati succeeds as ruler of the Ava Kingdom and offers peace to the Taungoo dynasty, ending the Taungoo–Ava War (1538–45), and leaving the Taungoo as the dominant rulers in Burma.

=== October–December ===
- October 20 – The "New Laws"(Leyes Nuevas), officially the New Laws of the Indies for the Good Treatment and Preservation of the Indians are repealed less than a year after being issued by King Carlos of Spain.
- October 31 – (26th day of 9th month of Tenbun 14) The Siege of Kawagoe Castle begins, as part of an unsuccessful attempt by the Uesugi clan to regain Kawagoe Castle from the Late Hōjō clan in Japan.
- November 9 – Pietro Lando, the Doge of the Republic of Venice since 1538, dies and Francesco Donato is elected in his place.
- November 10 – A truce is signed between the Holy Roman Empire and the Ottoman Empire following the Siege of Nice, as Emperor Charles V acknowledges the Ottoman conquests.
- November 15 – (10 Ramadan 952 AH) Hamida Banu Begum, Empress consort of India's Mughal Empire and wife of the Emperor Humayun, returns to the capital, Agra, after a three-year absence. She is accompanied by an army provided to Humayun by Tahmasp I, Shah of Iran.
- November 23 – King Henry VIII opens the Parliament of England for the ninth time, in a session that lasts until December 24.
- December 13 – The Council of Trent officially opens in northern Italy (it closes in 1563).
- December 24 – King Henry VIII gives royal assent to multiple acts passed by the English Parliament on its final day, including the Dissolution of Colleges Act and the Custos Rotulorum Act.

=== Undated ===
- Battle of Sokhoista: The army of the Ottoman Empire defeats an alliance of Georgian dynasties.
- Diogo I Nkumbi a Mpudi overthrows his uncle Pedro I of Kongo to become manikongo.
- In China, a large failure of the harvest in Henan province occurs due to excessive rainfall, which drives up the price of wheat, and forces many to flee their rural counties; those who stay behind are forced to survive by eating leaves, bark, and human flesh.
- In the territory of New Spain in modern-day Mexico, the Cocoliztli Epidemic of 1545–1548 begins.
- St. Anne's Church, Augsburg converts to Lutheranism.
- The Italian mathematician Gerolamo Cardano published a book on algebra, Ars Magna, that contained the first published algebraic solutions to cubic and quartic equations.

== Births ==
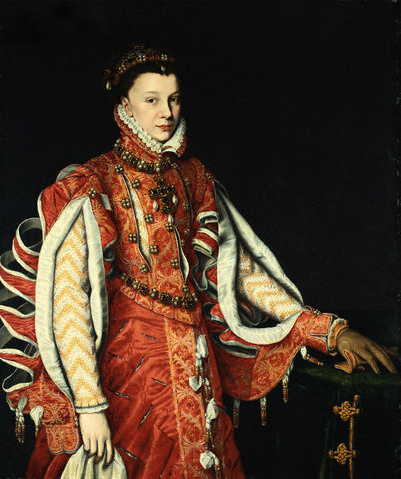
Elisabeth of Valois

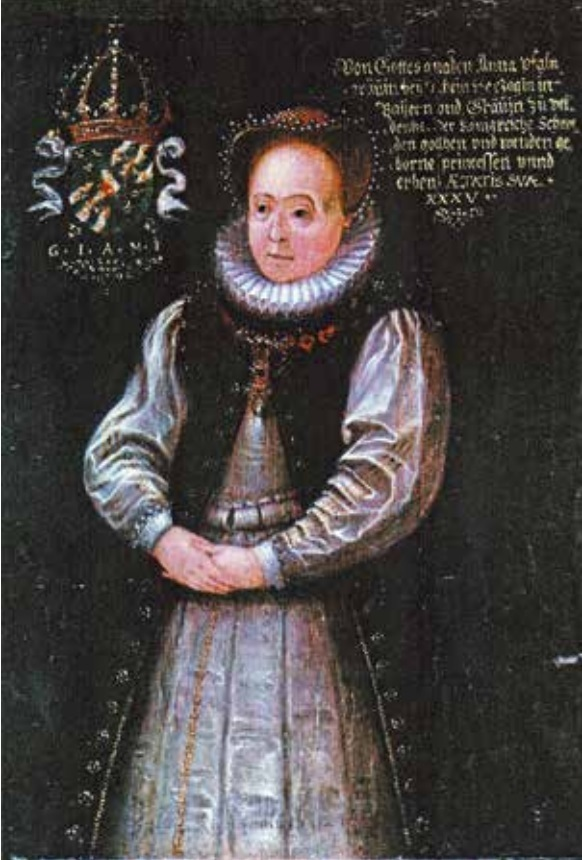
Anna Maria of Sweden

- January 1 – Magnus Heinason, Faroese naval hero (d. 1589)
- January 11 – Guidobaldo del Monte, Italian mathematician, astronomer and philosopher (d. 1607)
- March – Gaspare Tagliacozzi, Italian surgeon and anatomist (d. 1599)
- March 2 – Thomas Bodley, English diplomat and scholar, founder of the Bodleian Library, Oxford (d. 1613)
- March 18 – Julius Echter von Mespelbrunn, German bishop (d. 1617)
- March 25 – John II, Duke of Schleswig-Holstein-Sonderburg, Duke of Schleswig-Holstein-Sønderburg (d. 1622)
- April 1 – Peder Claussøn Friis, Norwegian clergyman and author (d. 1614)
- April 2 – Elisabeth of Valois, queen of Philip II of Spain (d. 1568)
- April 15 – Karl II, Duke of Münsterberg-Oels, Duke of Oels (1565–1617), Duke of Bernstadt (1604–1617) (d. 1617)
- April 24 – Henry Wriothesley, 2nd Earl of Southampton, English earl (d. 1581)
- April 28 – Yi Sun-sin, Korean naval commander (d. 1598)
- May 1 – Franciscus Junius, French theologian (d. 1602)
- May 22 – Karl Christoph, Duke of Münsterberg (d. 1569)
- June 6 – Jerome Gratian, Spanish Carmelite and writer (d. 1614)
- June 13 – Naitō Nobunari, Japanese samurai and daimyō of Omi Province (d. 1612)
- June 19 – Princess Anna Maria of Sweden, Swedish royal (d. 1610)
- July 8 – Don Carlos of Spain, son of Philip II of Spain (d. 1568)
- August 1 – Andrew Melville, Scottish theologian and religious reformer (d. 1622)
- August 27 – Alexander Farnese, Duke of Parma (d. 1592)
- September 7 – Eitel Friedrich IV, Count of Hohenzollern, First Count of Hohenzollern-Hechingen (d. 1605)
- September 20 – Yamanaka Yukimori, Japanese samurai (d. 1578)
- October 15 – Elisabeth of Anhalt-Zerbst, Abbess of Gernrode and Frose, later Countess of Barby-Mühlingen (d. 1574)
- October 19 – John Juvenal Ancina, Italian oratorian and bishop (d. 1604)
- November 20 – Ernst Ludwig, Duke of Pomerania (d. 1592)
- November 25 – Ana de Jesús, Spanish Discalced Carmelite nun and spiritual writer (d. 1621)
- December 6 – Janus Dousa, Dutch historian and noble (d. 1604)
- December 7 – Henry Stuart, Lord Darnley, consort of Mary, Queen of Scots (d. 1567)
- date unknown
  - George Bannatyne, collector of Scottish poems (d. 1608)
  - John Field, British Puritan clergyman and controversialist (d. 1588)
  - John Gerard, English botanist (d. 1612)
  - Ismihan Sultan, Ottoman princess, daughter of Selim II and wife of Sokollu Mehmed Pasha (d. 1585)
  - William Morgan, Welsh Bible translator (d. 1604)
  - Azai Nagamasa, Japanese nobleman (d. 1573)
  - Mashita Nagamori, Japanese warlord (d. 1615)
- probable – Nicholas Breton, English poet and novelist (d. 1626)

== Deaths ==
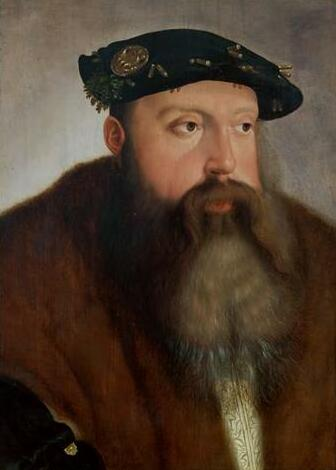
Louis X, Duke of Bavaria

- January 16 – George Spalatin, German reformer (b. 1484)
- February 12 or April 2 – Stanisław Odrowąż, Polish noble (b. 1509)
- April 3 – Antonio de Guevara, Spanish chronicler and moralist (b. 1481)
- April 10 – Costanzo Festa, Italian composer (b. 1495)
- April 22 – Louis X, Duke of Bavaria (b. 1496)
- April 25 – Jobst II, Count of Hoya (b. 1493)
- May – Agnes Howard, Duchess of Norfolk, English noblewoman (b. c. 1477)
- May 22 – Sher Shah Suri, Indian ruler (b. 1486)
- June 4 – John Louis, Count of Nassau-Saarbrücken (1472–1545) (b. 1472)
- June 12 – Francis I, Duke of Lorraine (b. 1517)
- June 15 – Elizabeth of Austria, Polish noble (b. 1526)
- July 7 – Pernette Du Guillet, French poet (b. c. 1520)
- July 12 – Maria Manuela, Princess of Portugal (b. 1527)
- August 8 – Injong of Joseon, 12th king of the Joseon dynasty of Korea (b. 1515)
- August 22 – Charles Brandon, 1st Duke of Suffolk, English politician and husband of Mary Tudor (b. c. 1484)
- August 27 – Piotr Gamrat, Polish Catholic archbishop (b. 1487)
- September
  - Hans Baldung, German artist (b. 1480)
  - Hkonmaing, king of the Ava kingdom (b. c. 1497)
- September 1 – Francis de Bourbon, Count of St. Pol, French noble (b. 1491)
- September 9 – Charles II, Duke of Orléans, (b. 1522)
- September 24 – Albert of Mainz, elector and archbishop of Mainz (b. 1490)
- October 18 – John Taverner, English composer (b. c. 1490)
- date unknown
  - William Latimer, English churchman and scholar (b. c. 1467)
  - Fernão Lopez, Portuguese renegade
  - Vicente Masip, Spanish painter (b. 1506)
