= French invasion of the Isle of Wight =

1545 battle between England and France during the Italian Wars

- Part of the Italian War of 1542–1546.
Date	July 1545
Location	Isle of Wight, England
Result	English victory

Belligerents
England	France

Commanders and leaders
Robert Fyssher	Le Seigneur de Tais

Strength
300–2,800 militiamen	Approx 500 soldiers

Casualties and losses
Unknown	Unknown

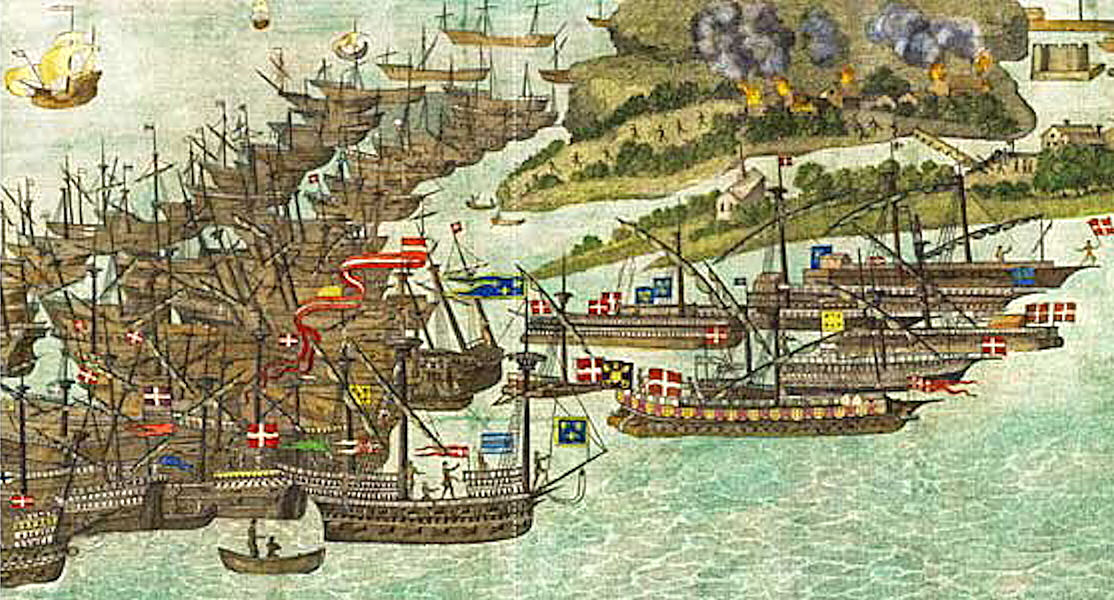
A French fleet attacks Bembridge in 1545.

The French invasion of the Isle of Wight occurred during the Italian Wars in July 1545. The invasion was repulsed.

France had a long history of attacking the Isle of Wight, though the 1545 campaign would be the final time the French attempted to take it. The French forces were led by Claude d'Annebault. The battles of the Solent and Bonchurch ended without a clear victory for either side. However, as the French withdrew from the island, the campaign could be considered an English victory. Details of the campaign have not been very well recorded, with conflicting accounts regarding its outcome; some sources state that the operation was inconclusive, with the English suffering heavily, including the loss of the carrack Mary Rose at the Solent, while others claim that the French were defeated at each battle rather easily.

French strategy was to effect a landing at Whitecliff Bay and cross Bembridge Down to attack Sandown, and another landing at Bonchurch with a view to marching to link up at Sandown. The northern force was intercepted whilst crossing the Down, but fought its way to Sandown Castle, which was then under construction offshore. The southern force, meanwhile, was routed at St Boniface Down. Both forces were repulsed after stiff fighting.

The Chronicle of Charles Wriothesley (died 1562) reports: "The 21 day of July the French galleys and navie came before Portesmouth haven, and landed certeine of theyre armye in the Yle of Wyght, and there burned and camped there about to the nomber of 2,000 men, and came every tyde with theyr gallies and shott their ordinaunce at the Kinges ships in the haven; but the winde was so calme that the Kinges shippes could bear noe sayle, which was a great discomfort for them." Three days later a muster of 1500 men was sent from the City of London to repel them, but by the King's command turned back at Farnham, the French having left the Isle of Wight "and divers of them slaine and drowned".

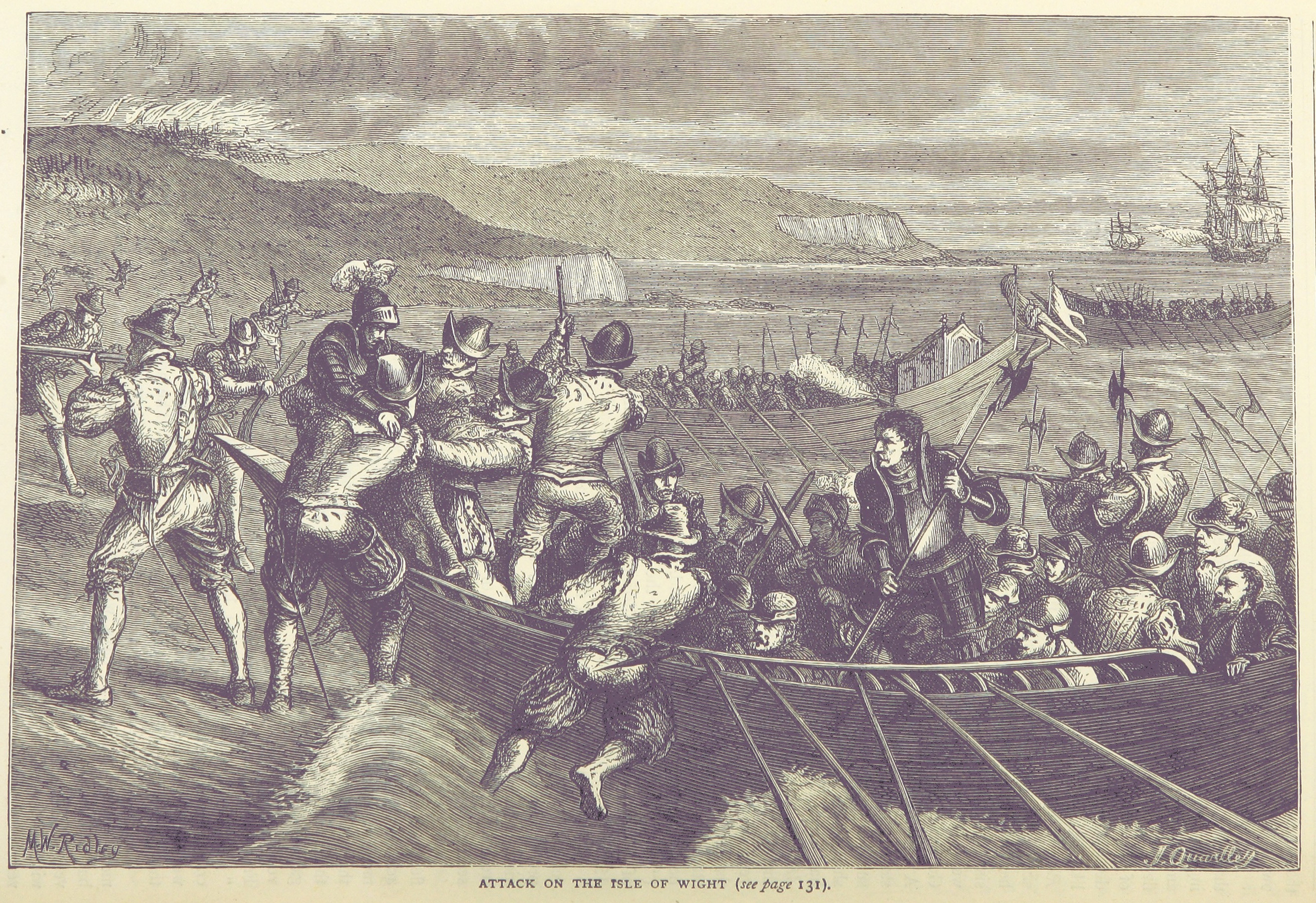
An 1873 illustration of the French landing

Contemporary accounts suggest that the French (or their mercenaries) sacked the area in order to provoke the English fleet into battle against a far larger fleet. Martin Du Bellay wrote: "To keep the enemy's forces separated, a simultaneous descent was made in three places. On one side Seigneur Pierre Strosse was bidden to land below a little fort where the enemy had mounted some guns with which they assailed our galleys in flank, and within which a number of Island infantry had retired. These, seeing the boldness of our men, abandoned the fort and fled southwards to the shelter of a copse. Our men pursued and killed some of them and burned the surrounding habitations".

A later mention by Sir John Oglander evidently paraphrases du Bellay: "They landed at three several places at one time, purposely to divide our forces. Pierre Strosse landed at St Helens where there was a little fort, and beat our men, being divided from the fort, into the woods. Le Seigneur de Tais, General of the Foot, landed at Bonchurch, where there was a hot skirmish between them and us, and on either party many slain."

The French seem to have landed at undefended points and then attacked defences from inland. At Whitecliff Bay and at Bonchurch they moved swiftly to seize the high ground. However, the attacks were expected and in both cases local forces reached the high grounds to oppose them. The settlement at Nettlestone and its manor were burnt.

At Bonchurch the French landed easily at Monk's Bay, but were then faced with the difficulty of breaking out from what is known descriptively as the "Undercliff". Their solution was to ascend the extremely steep slopes of St Boniface and Bonchurch Downs, which are over 700 feet (210 m) high. The defenders thus had them at a considerable advantage, having taken up positions on the top of the hill.

== The plaque at Seaview ==
The event is commemorated by a plaque in Seaview which reads:

During the last invasion of this country hundreds of French troops landed on the foreshore nearby. This armed invasion was bloodily defeated and repulsed by local militia 21st July 1545.

The veracity of this account has been challenged, on the grounds that there were few if any local inhabitants, the militia may have been sent from the mainland, the numbers involved are uncertain, and that there would be later attempted invasions of Great Britain, culminating in the Battle of Fishguard in 1797.
