= Monks Bay =

Bay on the Isle of Wight, England

Coordinates: 50°35′55″N 1°10′52″W

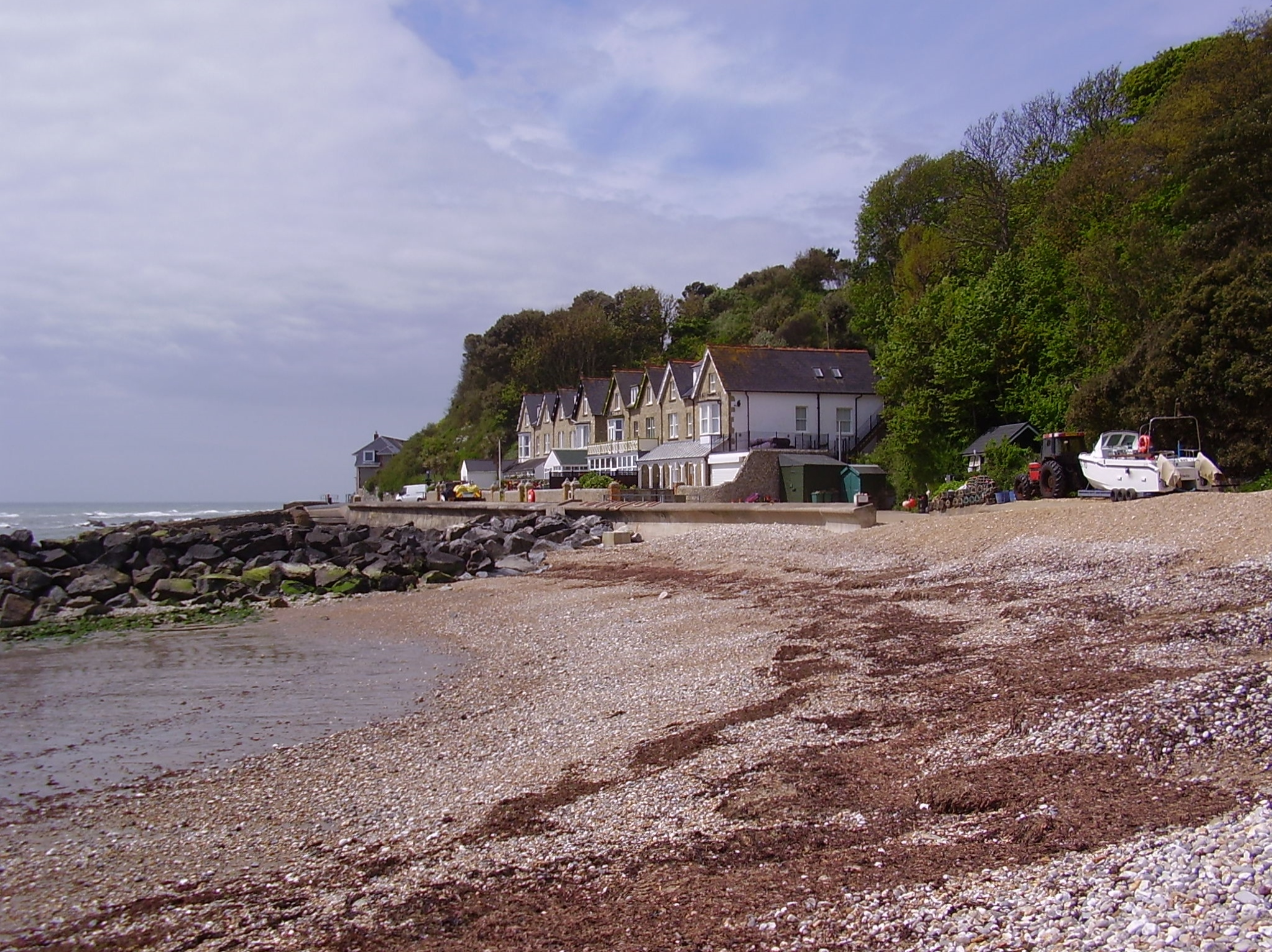
- Monks Bay

- Location within the Isle of Wight
- Civil parish: Ventnor
- Ceremonial county: Isle of Wight
- Region: South East
- Country: England
- Sovereign state: United Kingdom
- UK Parliament: Isle of Wight East

Monks Bay is situated on the southern coast of the Isle of Wight, England just to the east of the village of Bonchurch, it is around 1/3 mile (0.54 km) in length. It is popular with visitors and is one of the natural highlights of the town, which has hosted such figures as Charles Dickens. The bay is also a good site for local flora, and it has a row of houses which look out to the English Channel.

== History ==
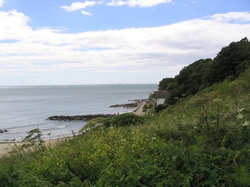
The area where the battle took place

Monks Bay derives its name from the belief that it is where French monks from Lyra Abbey landed after travelling from Normandy. The bay was also the site of the 1545 Battle of Bonchurch, one of the three locations where 2,000 French troops landed on the Isle of Wight coast as part of the Italian War of 1542–46. The French were repulsed, preventing their attempts to seize the island.

Historically, the area was notable as a venue for smuggling rings, where contraband would be landed and then transported inland. The bay was also used to legally disembark cargo from ships and for lobster and crab fishing, once a major source of local income, which still continues in the area.

In 1871, the Underley, a 1,292-ton iron-hulled sailing ship, ran around in a strong gale at the point between Monk's Bay and Steel Bay. She was on a voyage from London to Melbourne with thirty passengers and cargo on board, the vessel was lost but all her passengers and crew were saved bar one – a steward re-boarded the ship to rescue his pet bird and was washed overboard as it broke apart. Fragments of the wreck can still be seen by divers in the area when a gale has shifted the sands.

== Geology ==
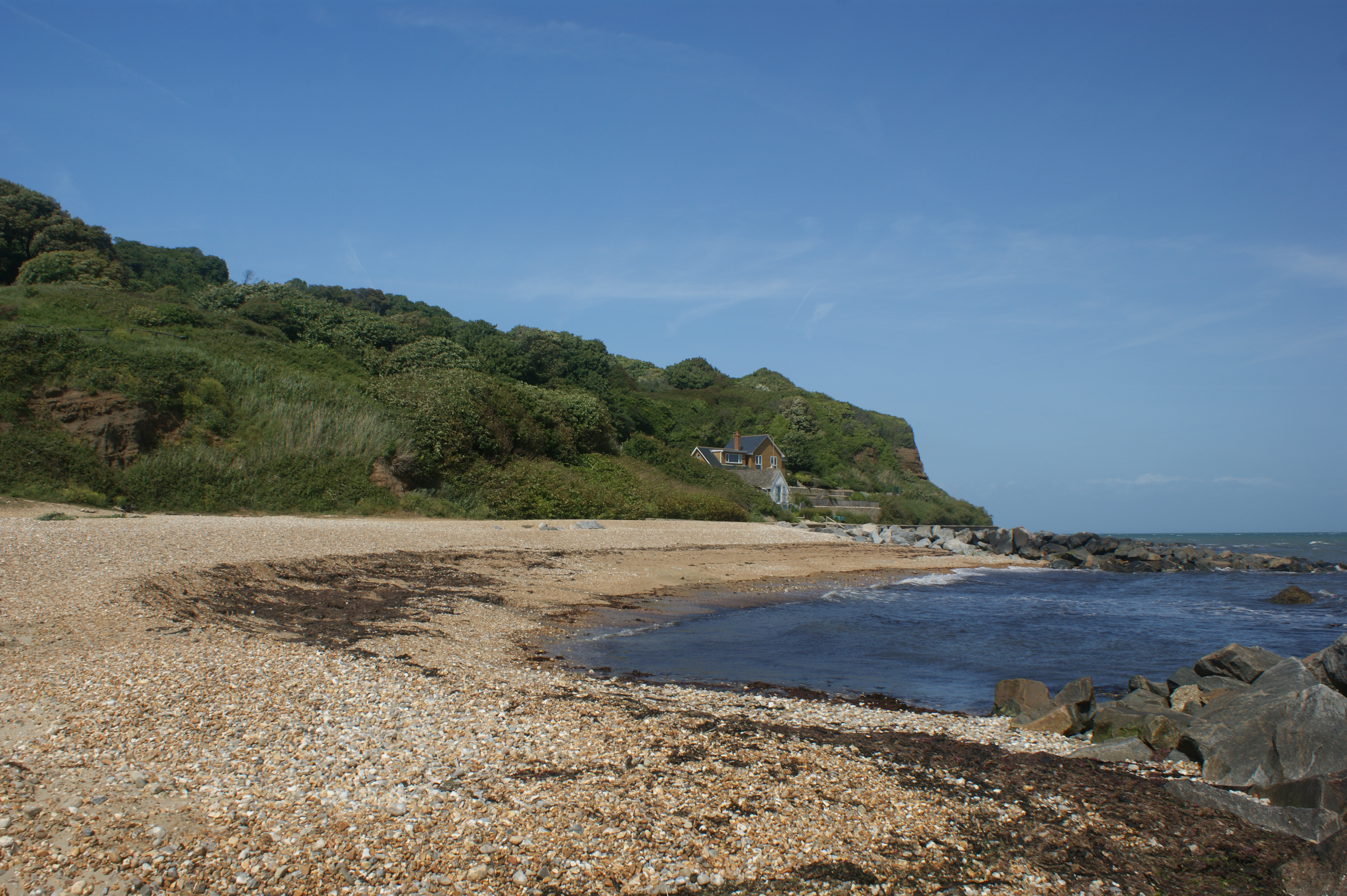
Looking up the bay

The cliffs backing Monks Bay are heavily vegetated but consist of Lower Greensand sediments overlain by Gault Clay. Above the high tide line, the bay has a sand and shingle beach, and below is a large expanse of sandy beach. In the early 1990s, the sea defences in the area were upgraded, with a £1.4 million investment project and the transportation of 25,000 tons of Norwegian granite and 40,000 cubic metres (52,000 cu yd) of sand and shingle to stop aggressive marine erosion. The bay gives its name to a type of Lower Albian ferruginous sandstone, formally known as Carstone, which is only found on the Isle of Wight.
