= Siege of Perpignan =

Siege of Perpignan may refer to:

- Siege of Perpignan (1542)
- Siege of Perpignan (1642)
