= Battle of Bonchurch =

1545 battle in the French invasion of the Isle of Wight

- Part of the French invasion of the Isle of Wight during the Italian War of 1542–1546.
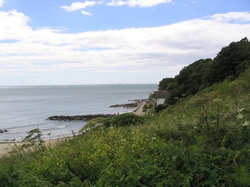
- Monks Bay in 2008. French troops advanced from the bay before they reached St. Boniface Down, the location where the fighting took place.
Date	July, 1545
Location	Bonchurch, Isle of Wight, England 50°36′12.46″N 1°11′55.43″W
Result	English victory

Belligerents
England	France

Commanders and leaders
Robert Fyssher	Le Seigneur de Tais

Strength
300–2,800 militiamen	Approx 500 soldiers

Casualties and losses
Unknown	Unknown

The Battle of Bonchurch took place in late July 1545 at Bonchurch on the Isle of Wight. No source gives the precise date, although 21 July is possible from the sequence of events. The battle was a part of the wider Italian War of 1542–1546, and took place during the French invasion of the Isle of Wight. Several landings were made, including at Bonchurch. Most accounts suggest that England won the battle, and the French advance across the island was halted.

The battle was between French regular soldiers, and local English militiamen. Although the French force that landed was considerably larger than the English force, it is thought that the number of French soldiers involved in this battle to be about 500, with the number of militiamen uncertain, with one source stating 300 and another 2,800. The English forces are believed to have been commanded by Captain Robert Fyssher, and the French by Le Seigneur de Tais.

The battle was one of several fought between English and French on the Isle of Wight. The majority of sources state that the English won this battle, although one suggests that the French were victorious. The battle was fought as part of the French attempt to cause enough damage to force English ships to leave their defensive positions and attack in less favourable conditions, which was something they failed to achieve and thus had to withdraw from the island Other French landings were made at Sandown, Bembridge, and St Helens.

== Background ==
The Italian War of 1542-1546 arose from a dispute between Holy Roman Emperor Charles V and Francis I of France, which had not been settled by the Italian War of 1535-1538. This led to war between France, backed by the Ottoman Empire and Jülich-Cleves-Berg, and the Holy Roman Empire, backed by the Kingdom of England, Spain, Saxony, and Brandenburg. After two years of fighting Charles V, and Henry VIII invaded France. In September 1544, English forces captured Boulogne. France failed to re-capture the city by force. Peace talks between England and France were unsuccessful, partly because Henry VIII refused to return Boulogne. As a result, Francis I decided to invade England, hoping that Henry VIII would return Boulogne in return for his leaving England. Thirty thousand French troops and a fleet of some 400 vessels were assembled, and sailed from Le Havre on 16 July.

On 18 July, French and English ships engaged off the English coast, marking the beginning of the Battle of the Solent. The outnumbered English ships withdrew, hoping to lure the French into the shallows of Spithead, but the French wanted to fight in the more open waters of eastern Spithead where the English could be encircled. To entice the English to abandon their defensive position and engage the larger French fleet, they decided to invade the Isle of Wight and burn buildings and crops. France also hoped that the residents of the island might support them and rebel against England, so that it could be used as a base. French troops landed on 21 July.

During the Hundred Years War, society had become militarised: male adults were obliged to fight if needed, and they received regular military training. The Captain of the Isle, Sir Richard Worsley of Appuldurcombe House, was considered a "capable and energetic commander". He was assisted by Sir Edward Bellingham, an officer in the regular army, and a headquarters staff.

The French plan at Bonchurch may have been to burn Wroxall and Appuldurcombe, capture and consolidate a position on the heights of St. Boniface Down, and then link up with another French landing near Sandown. The area around Bonchurch was important because nearby Dunnose Point offered safe anchorage, and had a fresh water source.

== Prelude ==
2000 French troops landed at three locations on the coast, including about 500 at Bonchurch. The landing was unopposed and the French began to advance inland, up the steep and thickly wooded slopes. The Isle of Wight militia learned of the French invasion quickly; 300 of them, under the command of Captain Robert Fyssher, were already waiting at St. Boniface Down for the French to advance from Monks Bay.

== Battle ==
There is no comprehensive account of the battle. However, it could have taken place at dawn and lasted until midday. Some accounts suggest that local women participated by shooting arrows at the French.

=== Outcome ===
One amateur source claims that the French won the battle at Bonchurch. The English forces took up a defensive position flanked by cliffs and screened by woods. The first French attack was apparently repelled but the French commander Le Seigneur de Tais rallied his troops. A second attack was launched, with the French forces in the 'array' fighting formation. The account concludes by claiming that, after heavy casualties on both sides, the English line broke and the militia routed, and that Captain Robert Fyssher shouted an offer of £100 for anyone who could bring him a horse to escape, because of his being too fat to run. Sir John Oglander is claimed to have said: "but none could be had even for a kingdom". The captain was never heard from again, and the account suggests he was either killed, or captured and buried at sea. All other relevant sources state it was a comprehensive English victory.

== Aftermath ==
Casualties on both sides were heavy. Another skirmish took place several days later, when the English engaged Frenchmen, disembarked from ships retreating from Portsmouth to look for fresh water. A senior French commander, Chevalier D'Aux, was killed. The assumed English victory at Bonchurch only had a marginal impact on the course of the war, because it only involved a fraction of the forces engaged throughout. Had the French captured the island, it is unlikely this would have drastically affected the war, because more significant territory was being contested. However, the island could have been used to support French operations against England; Claude d'Annebault, commander of the French armada, recorded: "having it [the Isle of Wight] under our control, we could then dominate Portsmouth... and so put the enemy to extraordinary expense in maintaining a standing army and navy to contain us". Although some sources do claim that the victory at Bonchurch was responsible for the French withdrawal, the source that claims a French victory says that fighting at Bembridge was ultimately responsible for forcing the French to leave.

== Sources ==
- Goodwin, John. Bonchurch from A-Z. Bonchurch: The Bonchurch Trading Company, 1992. ISBN 1-873009-00-3
- Knecht, Robert J. Renaissance Warrior and Patron: The Reign of Francis I. Cambridge: Cambridge University Press, 1994. ISBN 0-521-57885-X.
- Scarisbrick, J. J. Henry VIII. London: The Folio Society, 2004.
