= Battle of the Solent =

1545 battle of the Italian War of 1542–1546

- Part of the Italian War of 1542–1546
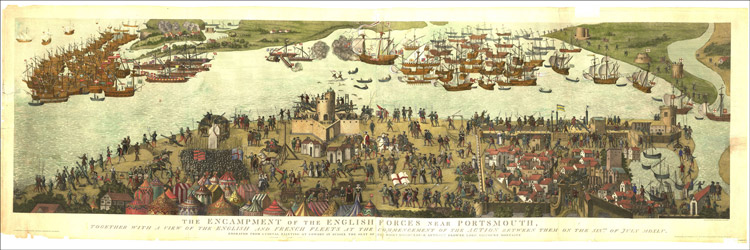
- The "Cowdray engraving" of the battle, 1778
Date	18–19 July 1545
Location	The Solent 50°46′39″N 1°13′35″W
Result	English victory

Belligerents
France	England

Commanders and leaders
Claude d'Annebault	John Dudley

Strength
175 ships	12,000 soldiers in 80 ships

Casualties and losses
No ships lost	About 400 dead in sinking of Mary Rose
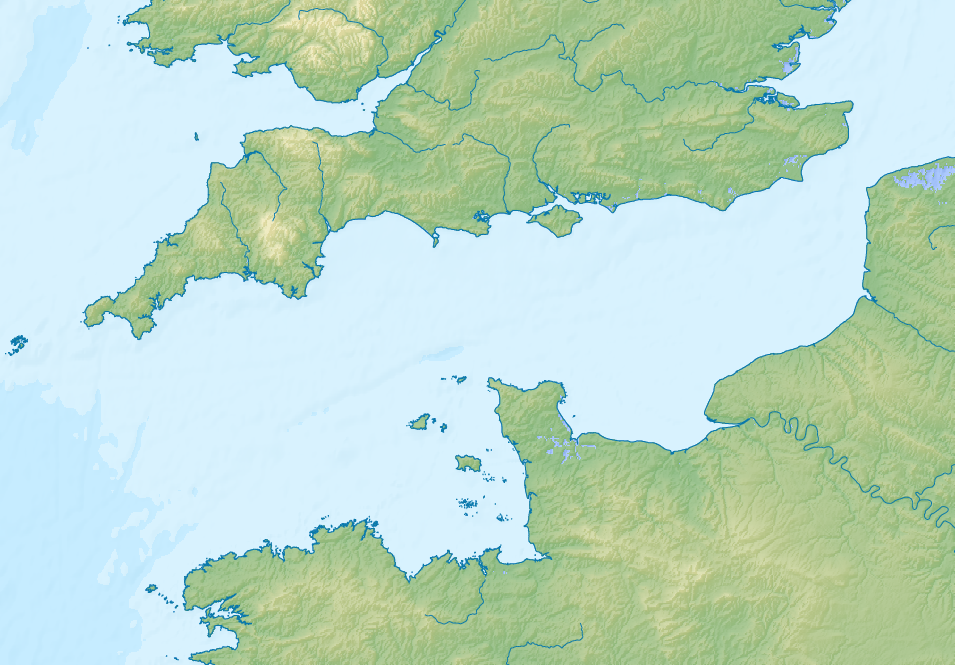
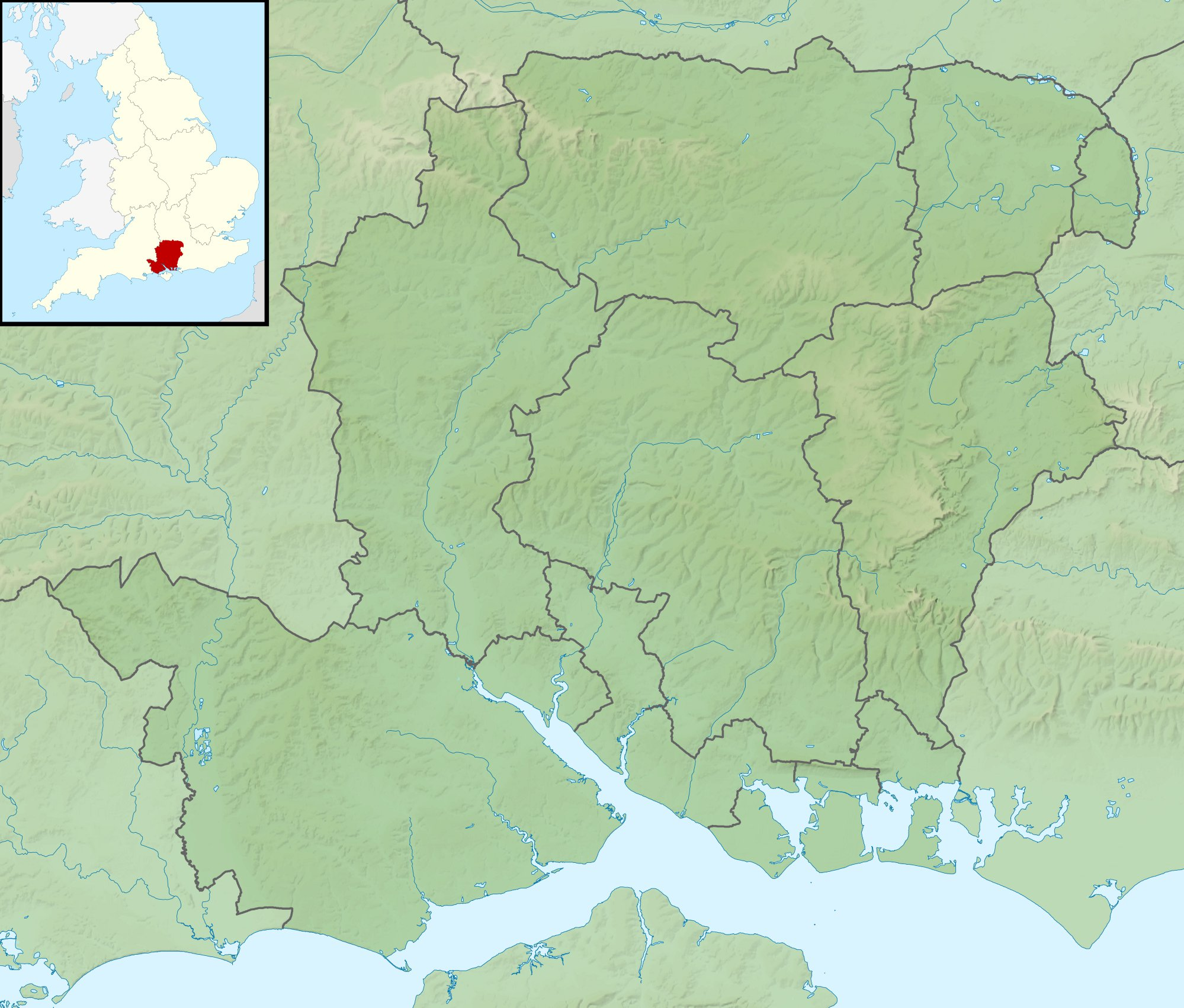
- Location within English Channel Battle of the Solent (Hampshire)

The naval Battle of the Solent took place on 18 and 19 July 1545 during the Italian Wars, between the fleets of Francis I of France and Henry VIII of England, in the Solent, between Hampshire and the Isle of Wight. This was one of only two full-fledged naval battles fought by King Henry VIII's Tudor navy, along with the earlier Battle of Saint-Mathieu.

The engagement resulted in a standstill between both sides, but the French ambition to conduct a larger invasion of England had been rendered untenable by the fighting, and the French fleet withdrew shortly after. The battle is remembered today primarily for the sinking of the English carrack, Mary Rose.

== Prelude ==
In 1545, France launched an invasion of England with 38,000 soldiers in 300 ships. Against this armada — larger than the Spanish Armada 43 years later — the English had about 12,000 soldiers and 80 ships.

The French expedition started disastrously, with the 800-ton flagship Philippe or Carraquon being destroyed on 6 July in an accidental fire while at anchor in the Seine. Admiral Claude d'Annebault transferred his flag to La Maistresse, which then ran aground as the fleet set sail. The leaks were patched up and the fleet crossed the Channel. The French entered the Solent and landed troops on the Isle of Wight.

== Battle ==
On 18 July, the English came out of Portsmouth and engaged the French at long range, with little damage being done on either side. La Maitresse was close to sinking due to her earlier damage but, although d'Annebault had to change his flagship again, she was saved.

On the night of 18 July, Henry dined aboard Great Harry, the flagship of Admiral John Dudley, Viscount Lisle.

The next day was calm, and the French employed their galleys against the immobile English vessels. Toward evening, a breeze sprang up and, as Mary Rose, the flagship of Vice Admiral George Carew, advanced, she foundered and sank with the deaths of all but 35–40 of her crew. The precise reasons are not known, but it was believed at the time that the crew had forgotten to close the lower gunports after firing, so that when she heeled over in the breeze she took on water and sank. A witness with the French fleet believed that the galleys had sunk her, although this is not supported by other contemporary accounts and no physical evidence of this remains.

The wind subsequently died down but Lisle made use of the tides and currents to position his fleet and disrupt the formation of the larger French ships.

== Aftermath ==
The invasion of the Isle of Wight was repulsed. The attacking troops attempted to divide the defence by landing at several sites but did not venture inland or regroup. There were heavy casualties on both sides at the Battle of Bonchurch, the French at Sandown hastily retreated after losing their commanders in an attack on a newly built fort, and those that landed at Bembridge were ambushed.

On 22 July, unable to resupply and struggling with a leaking ship and illness among his crew, d'Annebault abandoned the invasion. He recalled the French troops and his fleet departed.

The next day, the French landed 1,500 troops near the town of Seaford, around 40 miles (64 km) to the east. They attempted to pillage a nearby village but were repelled by local militia led by Nicholas Pelham. D'Annebault then returned to France.
