= Christopher Cattan =

Swiss astrologer

Seigneur Christophe de Cattan, also called Christopher Cattan (flourished 1530s–1540s, died before 1558), presumed Francophone and Anglophone variants of the Italian name Cristoforo Cattaneo (a form sometimes used for him in current scholarship), was an Italian humanist author of the second quarter of the sixteenth century. Of Italian stock but Genevan origin, he served as a man-at-arms under French command in France, and wrote in French. He is known as the learned author of a work about Geomancy, which was published posthumously in 1558 in Paris as La Géomance du Seigneur Christofe de Cattan, with further printings in 1567 and 1577. Most, if not all of what is known about the author derives from information in the book itself.

For his authorities, Cattan names particularly three Geomantic texts of importance to him. One is the text beginning Estimaverunt Indi, which is identified as a treatise translated by Hugo of Santalla from the Arabic. One is the Tractatus Sphaerae of Bartholomew of Parma, written in 1288. The third is a Hebrew text beginning "Ha veenestre".

== Provenance ==
=== Gabriel Duprėau, editor ===
The first appearance in print of the book of Geomancy bearing Cattan's name is in a form revised and augmented by an editor. The editor was Gabriel Dupréau of Marcoussis, Essonne (in the Latin form, Gabriel Prateolus (or Praïeolus) Marcossius), 1511–1588, an anti-Protestant theologian, the notable scholarly translator (from Latin into French) of the works of William of Tyre, and author of De Vitis, Sectis et Dogmatibus Omnium Haereticorum, a directory of all heretics and heresies. The Géomance was translated into English (from the published French edition, with its front matter) by Francis Sparry as The Geomancie of Maister Christopher Cattan Gentleman, published in London in 1591. (Sparry translates Dupréau's preface to the reader, and does not add one of his own.) One Francis Sparry was a bookseller in St Michael Wood Street (in the City of London) who had dealings with the Stationers' Company over the illegal import of bound books from Rouen during the later 1550s. The English translation has been attributed to the young Francis Sparry, who accompanied Sir Walter Raleigh to Guyana in 1595.

As touching the identity of "Christopher Cattan", the title page of the original edition calls the author "Seigneur Christofe de Cattan Gentilhomme Genevoys". The title Seigneur is equivalent to "Lord", and the introduction of "de" into the name, and the term "Gentilhomme" indicate an aristocratic or gentry status. "Genevoys" means "of Geneva". The royal authority to publish, dated 1558, signed by the King and by Maistre J[e]an Nicot, and sealed with yellow wax, is granted to Jean Corozet and Gilles Gilles, booksellers of Paris. The opening Epistle (by M. Dupréau) dedicates the work to M. Nicot, (Seigneur du Bosnay et du Chesne, Counsellor to the King (then Henry II) and Master of Requests of the "Hostel"), and is dated from Paris, 19 September 1558. Having introduced Geomancy, M. Dupréau observes that many have attempted to practise this ancient art, but that Christofe de Cattan, a Genevan gentleman, and a man-at-arms of the compagnie de feu M. de Thais (i.e. the late M. de Thais), one with deep interest and knowledge of those matters, has mastered this art and brought it to perfection.

=== Christofe de Cattan and Jean de Thais ===
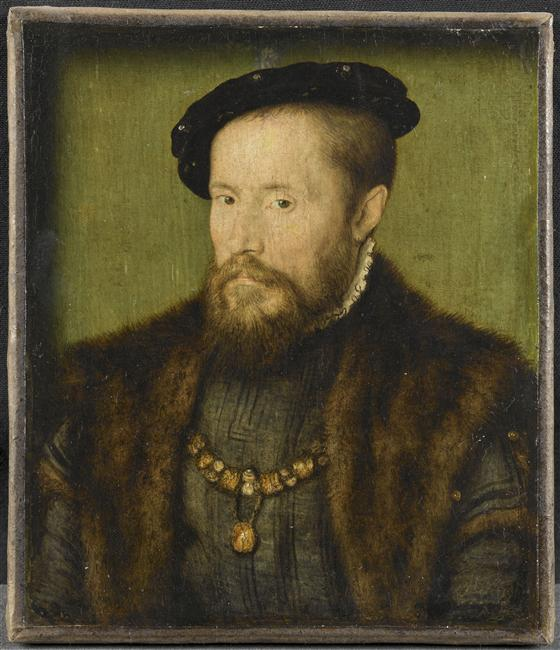
Cattan's dedicatee: Jean de Thais (de Taïx), by Corneille de Lyon (Musée Condé). Seigneur Christofe de Cattan was his servant and man-at-arms.

In his own Preface (also included in the printed work), Cattan himself says he has written the book at the request and prayer of "Monsieur de Tays" (who is an interested practitioner of this science) as a service to him, for his diversion, or to give to whom he please, as Cattan is his soldier and servant. "Monsieur de Tays" or "Thais" is the senior military commander Jean de Thais (died 1553), Seigneur de Thais (or Thaïx), who in around 1521 became Master-General of the French Artillery in France. In 1525 his role was extended to include the same office for the French in Italy. In 1543, François I gave him the title of Grand Maître and Capitaine-Général de l'Artillerie. (The title "Grand maître de l'artillerie de France" became one of the Great Offices of the Crown in 1599.) He was succeeded by Charles de Cossé-Brissac in 1547. Jean de Thais campaigned extensively in northern Italy and Piedmont for the French King, as well as in northern France against the English, and had many Italian troops in his armies. He died in 1552 or 1553.

Biographical context can be derived from the examples given by Cattan in the third book of the Géomance. The examples, which Cattan presents as real "readings" performed by himself for various named persons, include reference to his master M. de Tays. They include a reading concerning Pope Paul III for the year 1538; M. de Lymoges having gone into Scotland to accompany the Queen, and to act as Ambassador for the King of France (p. 133); the visit of Cardinal Agostino Trivulzio to France to broker peace between the King and the Emperor (probably 1536) (pp. 140–41); the preparations of Charles V at Nice to make war against François I in Provence (?1538) (pp. 142–43); a reading taken at Fontainebleau for the death of the Comte de Nouelaire (pp. 143–44); the purchase of a horse at Lyon for M. de Tays (pp. 150–51); and a figure for M. de Lymoges in 1538 (pp. 158–59).

The author has prepared figures at the direct requests of Seigneur de Thais himself (p. 113-14, p. 144); Seigneur de la Ferté (possibly François de la Ferté, Captain of the Garde du Corps, 2nd French Company), in a romantic question (p. 128); his friend signor Bernard Garimbert, a gentleman of Parma (p. 131); a great lady of the court of the King of France (p. 132); the organist of the Bishop of Limoges (p. 133); the Seigneur de Clermont de Lodève (pp. 134–35); a gentleman of the King's court (pp. 135–36); and the Comte de Tonnerre (p. 142).

=== Author ===
Cattan writes that he hopes to bring forward two other works, one on Physiognomy, and one on Chiromancy. M. Dupréau goes on to say that a friend gave him the book (presumably in manuscript), and that he has attempted to make it more intelligible, for the original language "was in many places wonderfully obscure, difficult and defective, and more Italian than French, the author of this work being Italian by speech and nationality, and not very experienced in our French language." (The "original" was therefore written in Italianate French.) Lastly (he says to Maistre Nicot), he has dedicated it to him because that is what the author would have done if he were alive, "vous cognoissant" (if he had known him; or, knowing him as he did), since Nicot has sought out many learned and distinguished people on this subject in Italy and Spain. ("Cattan" is therefore dead by 1558.)

Dupréau's statement that "Cattan" was Italian leaves a doubt about the word "Genevoys" (meaning of Geneva, Switzerland), because at the time there was a prominent patrician family of Cattaneo in Genoa (whose people are called in Italian "Genovese"), in Liguria. Scholarly opinion at present is said to incline to the identification of a Genoese called Cristoforo Cattaneo as the author of the Geomancy, also considering this as his only known published work.

== See also ==
- Bartolomeo della Rocca (Bartolomeo Cocles)
