= Steel Bay =

Bay on the Isle of Wight, England

Coordinates: 50°36′18″N 1°10′31″W

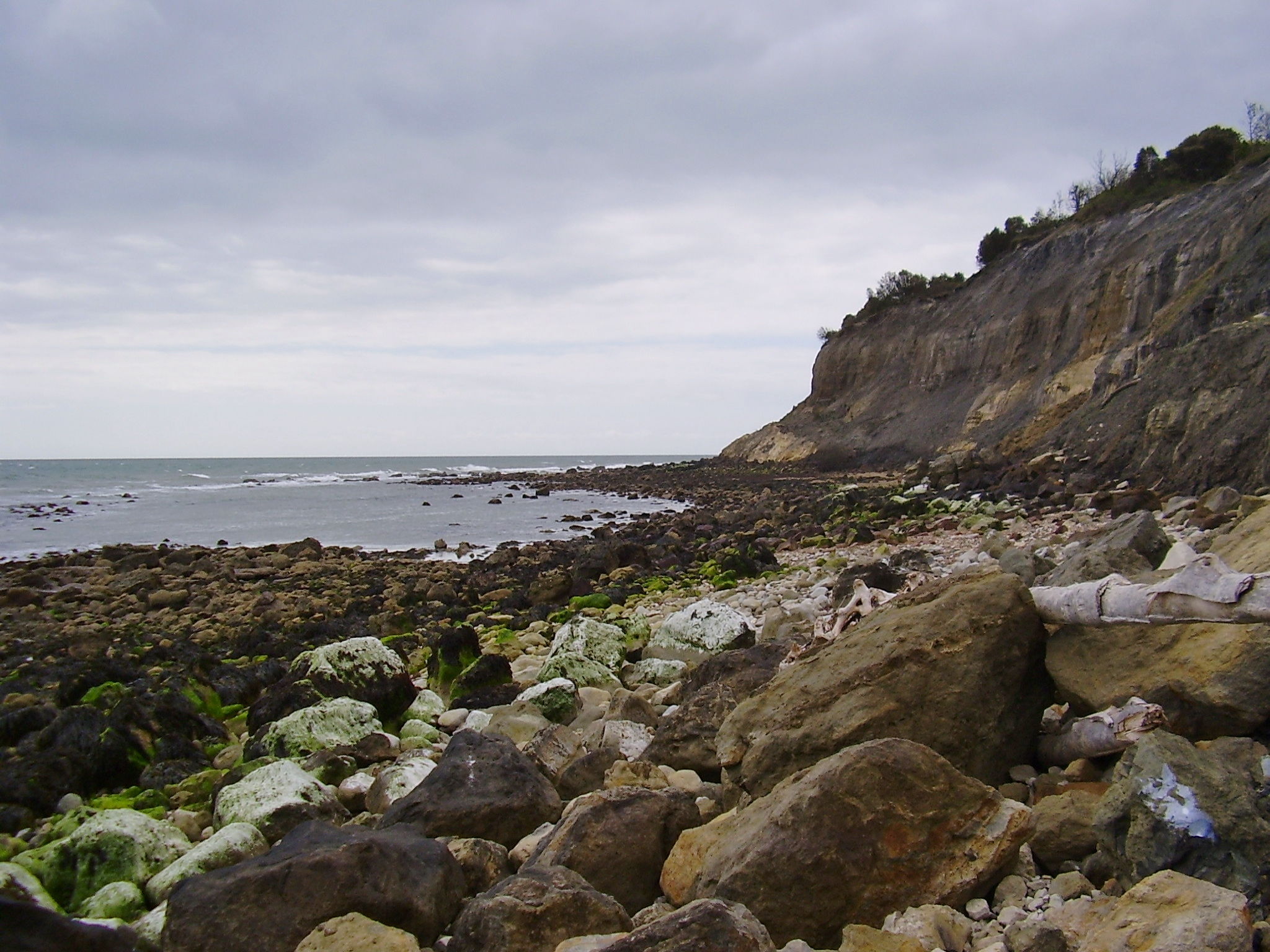
- The beach at Steel Bay

- Location within the Isle of Wight
- Civil parish: Ventnor
- Ceremonial county: Isle of Wight
- Region: South East
- Country: England
- Sovereign state: United Kingdom
- UK Parliament: Isle of Wight East

Steel Bay is a bay on the south-east coast of the Isle of Wight, England. It lies to the east of the village of Bonchurch. It faces south-east towards the English Channel and has a one-half-mile (0.80 km) shoreline. It stretches from Bordwood Ledge in the north to Dunnose headland in the south. The bay is remote and has no established access. It is best viewed from Dunnose which can be accessed by scrambling over The Landslip, which is close to the Isle of Wight Coastal Path in the woods to the east of Upper Bonchurch. The bay has a large intertidal reef with outlying rocks, which can be a danger for marine traffic.

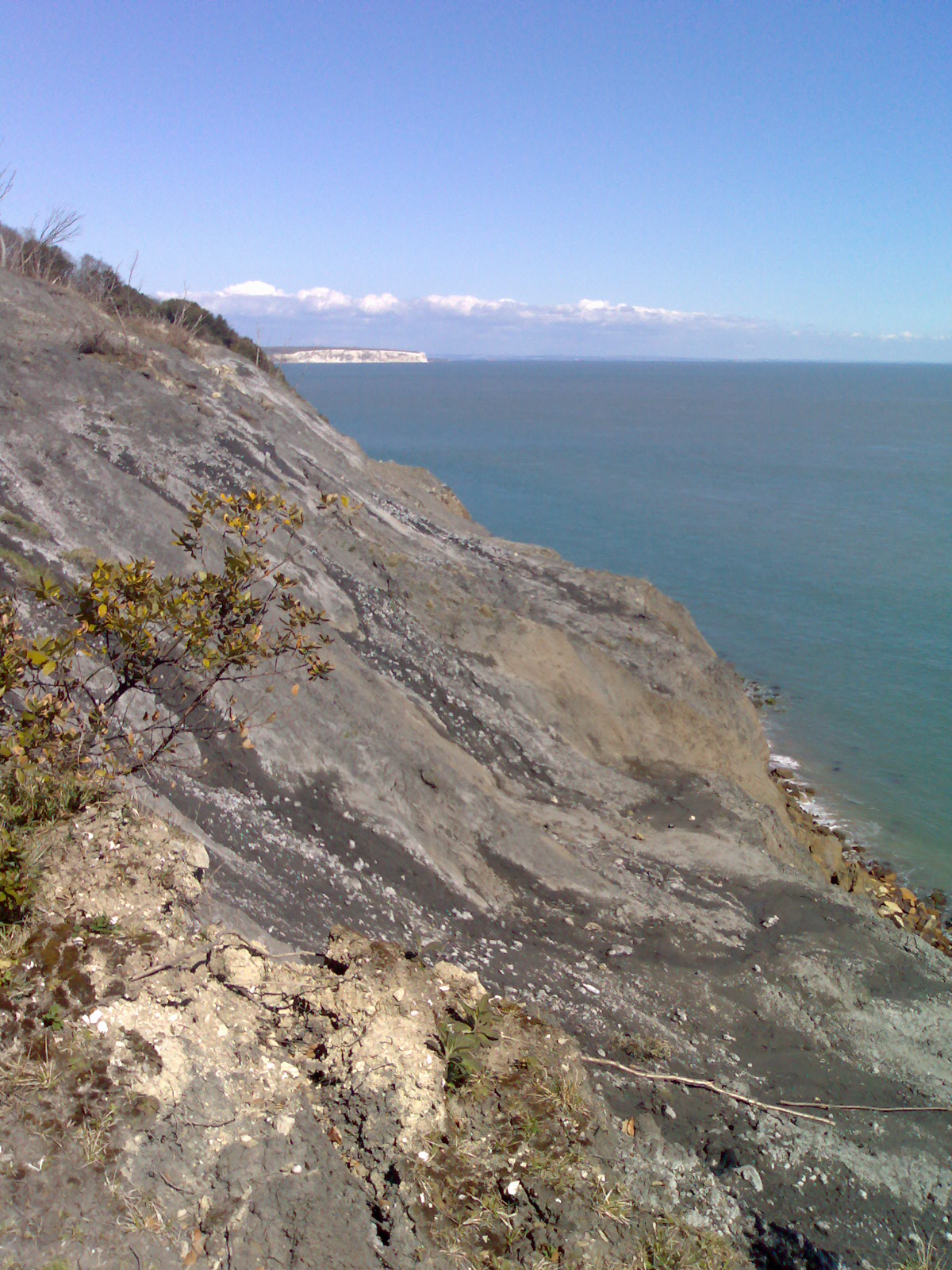
Steel Bay below The Landslip

Situated beneath Bonchurch Landslips, part of the wider Undercliff landslide complex, the cliffs are highly unstable and prone to landslides. The cliffs consist of sandstones from the uppermost sections of the Lower Greensand group overlain by the Gault Clay, with superficial deposits of landslide debris including material from the Upper Greensand and Chalk. The coastline saw major landslide events in 1810, 1818 and to a lesser extent in February 1995.

In 1871, the Underley, a 1,292-ton iron-hulled sailing ship, ran around in a strong gale at the point between Monk's Bay and Steel Bay. She was on a voyage from London to Melbourne with thirty passengers and cargo on board, the vessel was lost but all her passengers and crew were saved bar one – a steward re-boarded the ship to rescue his pet bird and was washed overboard as it broke apart. Fragments of the wreck can still be seen by divers in the area when a gale has shifted the sands.
