= Siege of Perpignan (1542) =

1542 battle in which Spain defeated France

- Part of the Italian War of 1542–1546
Date	1542
Location	Perpignan, Crown of Aragon, Spain (present-day France) 42.6986°N 2.8956°E
Result	Spanish victory

Belligerents
Spain	France

Commanders and leaders
Duke of Alba	Dauphin of France

Strength
Unknown	40,000 men

Casualties and losses
Unknown, but minor	Thousands of dead, sick or wounded

The siege of Perpignan took place in 1542, at Perpignan, between a larger French army commanded by Henry, Dauphin of France and the Spanish garrison at Perpignan. The Spaniards resisted until the arrival of the Spanish army under Don Fernando Álvarez de Toledo, Duke of Alba, causing the withdrawal of the French army. The siege was one of the costliest defeats of Francis I of France in the French offensive of 1542.

== French offensive of 1542 ==
In June, 1541, Francis I of France, allied with the United Duchies of Jülich-Cleves-Berg, the Ottoman Empire, Denmark, and Sweden, made a show of the power at his disposal, by arriving with five armies. Francis declared war on 12 July 1542, and the French immediately launched an offensive against Charles V with these armies. One of them, commanded by his son Charles, Duke of Orléans went to Luxembourg. Another, led by Francis's eldest son, Henry, Dauphin of France, marched to Roussillon towards the frontiers of Spain. The third, commanded by Marshal Maarten van Rossum marched over Brabant, the fourth under the Duke of Vendôme to the Netherlands, and the fifth went to the Piedmont commanded by the Marshal of France Claude d'Annebault.

The result of this new offensive was another failure for Francis I. In Flanders, the army of Maarten van Rossum, supported by a German army under the Duke of Jülich-Cleves-Berg, came up against a strong Imperial-Spanish defense of Leuven and Antwerp. The Duke of Orleans attacked Luxembourg, and in the meantime, in Piedmont, the French army only managed to capture some towns due to the cunning of Claude d'Annebault.

In southern France, in Roussillon, the army commanded by Henry, Dauphin of France, consisting of 40,000 men, supported by the army of Marshal Claude d'Annebault, laid siege to Perpignan, after losing valuable time which was used by the Emperor Charles to strengthen the towns of Salses, Fuenterrabía, and Perpignan.

== Siege of Perpignan ==
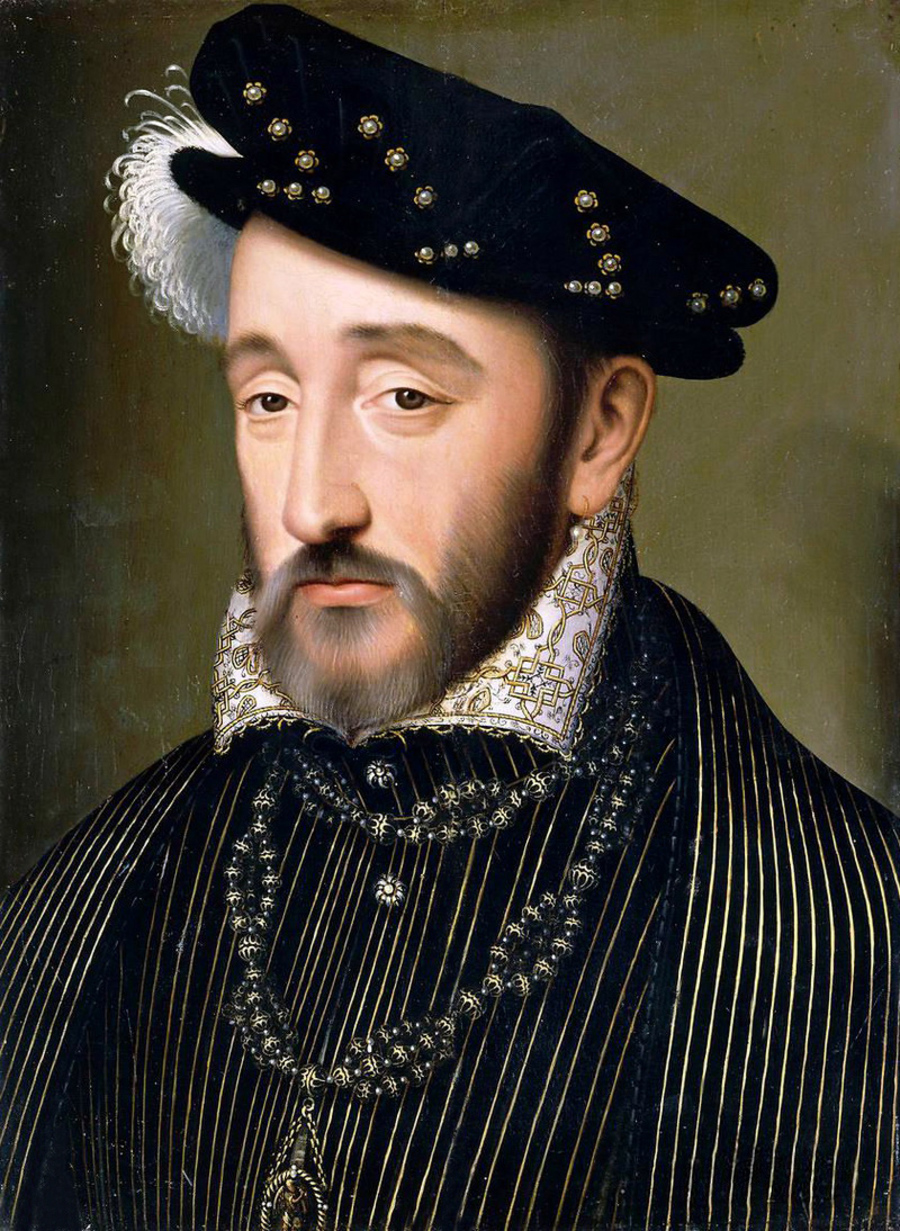
Henry of France by François Clouet.

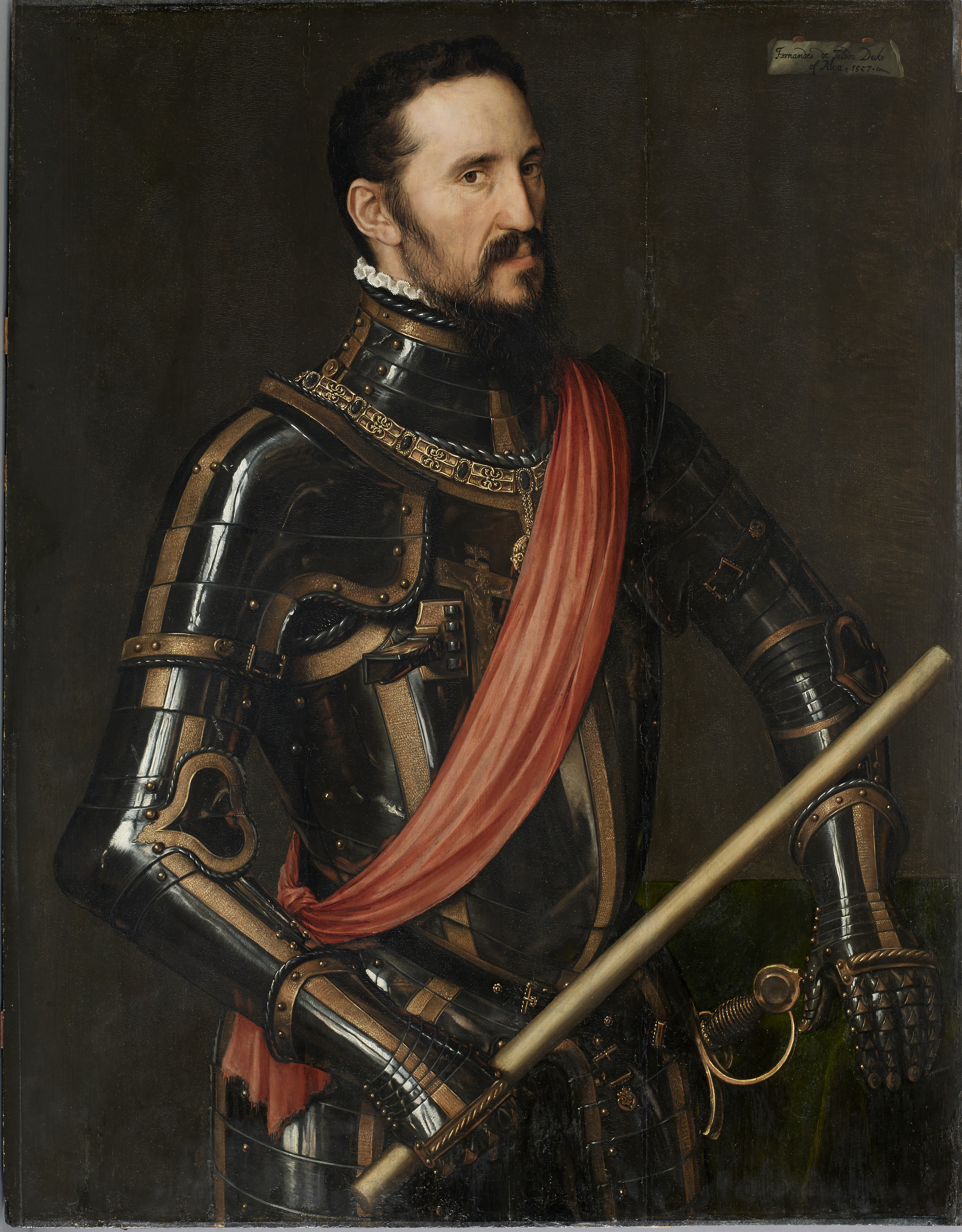
The Duke of Alba by Anthonis Mor.

Perpignan had been reinforced by the Emperor, which was held by several nobles of Castile and their troops, and also several hundred veteran Spanish soldiers.

Henry, who thought it would be an easy conquest, encountered fierce resistance. In a clever move of the Spanish, the defenders led by the Captains Cervellón and Machichaco, attacked the French besiegers by surprise and destroyed most of the heavy artillery with which it had already begun to damage the walls, causing a severe blow to the French army.

After many hardships for the French, and without any hope that the Ottoman Empire would help them, the town was eventually relieved by the army of the Duke of Alba, forcing the French commander, the Dauphin of France, to lift the siege, prompting the withdrawal of the French. The siege incurred a very heavy loss in dead, sick, and wounded among the French ranks, becoming a resounding French failure.

It is during the siege of Perpignan that the French barber surgeon Ambroise Paré, accompanying the French army, had the idea for a new technique. During the battle, Maréchal de Brissac was wounded, having been shot in the shoulder. As the bullet was impossible to find for extraction, Paré had the idea to ask the victim to put himself in the exact position he was in when shot. The bullet was then found and removed by Henry's personal surgeon Nicole Lavernault.

== Consequences ==
When the Emperor's power seemed broken after the African disaster, Francis I was far from reaping the benefits of an effort that ended up being rather costly, and he couldn't reply with the reputation he had acquired throughout Europe. The two monarchs Charles I of Spain and Francis I of France, used up the remainder of the year to prepare new campaigns. On the French part, Frances I did everything possible to obtain military support from the Ottoman Empire, persuading Suleiman the Magnificent to return to Hungary and attack Charles's possessions, while the Ottoman Admiral, Hayreddin Barbarossa, attacked the Spanish and Italian coasts.

In Europe, the French, under Antoine de Bourbon, Duke of Vendôme, captured Lillers in April and Marshal Claude d'Annebault had taken Landrecies. Wilhelm of Cleves invaded Brabant, and the fight began in Artois and Hainaut. King Francis inexplicably halted with his army near Rheims; in the meantime, Charles attacked Wilhelm, invading the Duchy of Julich and capturing Düren. The Duke of Orléans captured Luxembourg on 10 September, but the French conquest was useless, and Luxembourg was recaptured by the Imperial troops under the Prince of Orange. The Duke of Jülich-Cleves-Berg surrendered on 7 September, signing the Treaty of Venlo with the Emperor.

== See also ==
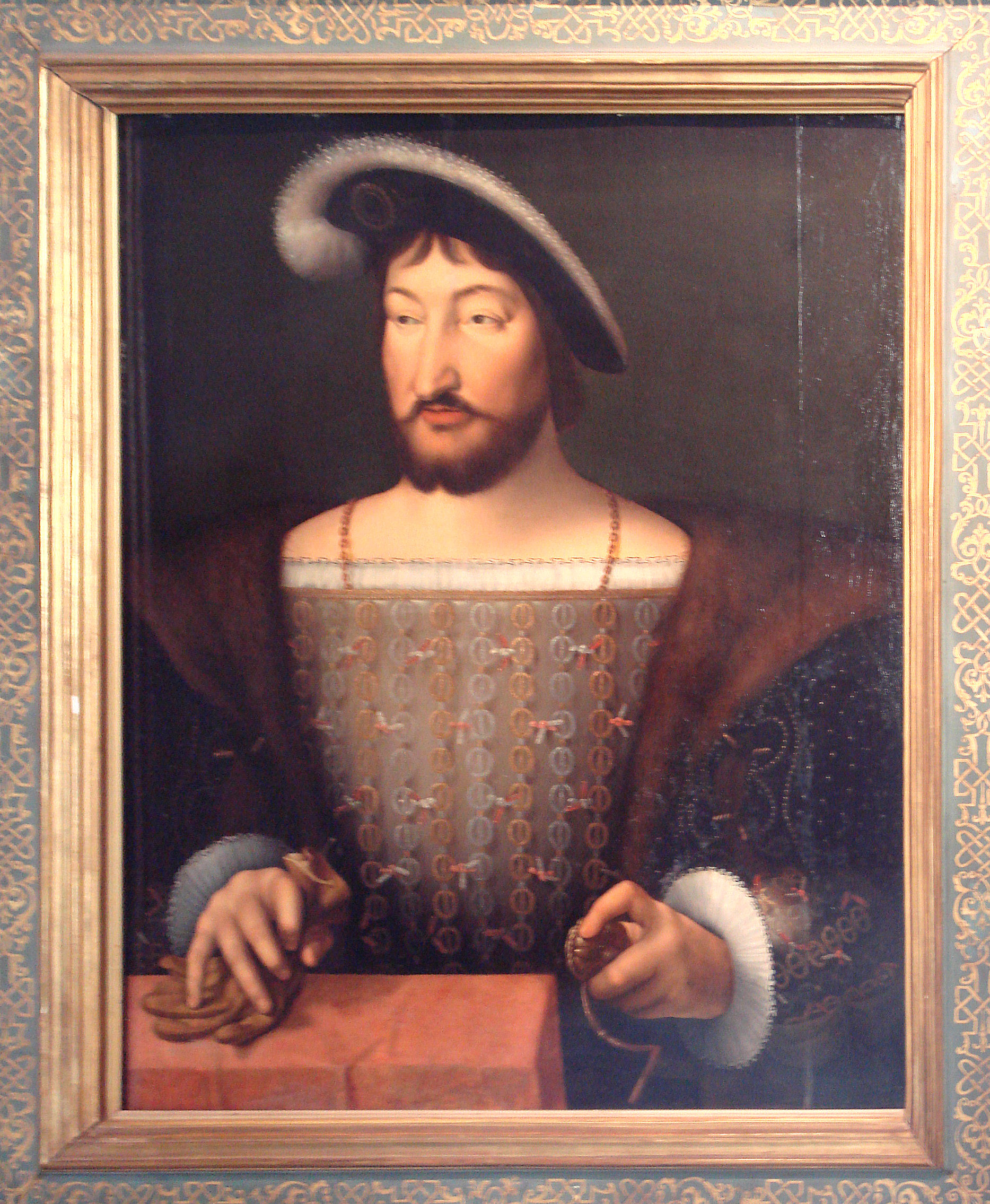
Francis I of France by Joos van Cleve.

- Battle of Muros Bay
- Italian Wars
- Franco-Ottoman alliance
- Suleiman the Magnificent
- United Duchies of Jülich-Cleves-Berg
