= Robert Fyssher =

16th-century English military officer

Captain Robert Fyssher led the local Isle of Wight militia to victory against French forces in the Battle of Bonchurch, in July 1545.
