= Jean de Thais =

French nobleman and officer

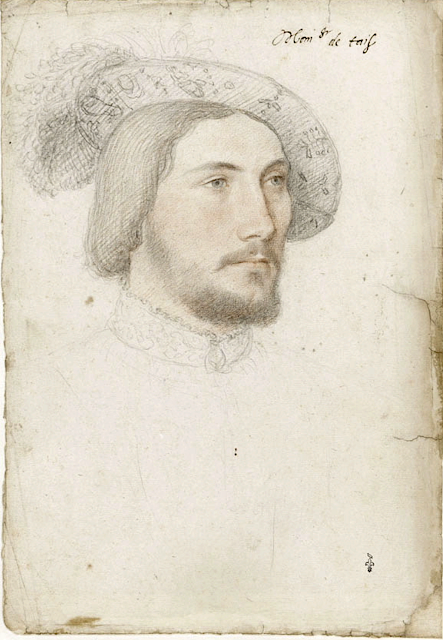
Sketch of Jean de Thais by Jean Clouet around 1530

Jean de Thais (died 1553) was a French nobleman and officer during the Italian Wars.

== Family ==
Jean was born in the château of Thais in Sorigny towards the end of the 15th century. His father was Aimery, lord (seigneur) of Thais and Sepmes (and son of Jacques, lord of Thais and Boissière, and Françoise d'Aloigny, lady of Sepmes). His mother was Françoise de la Ferté. He had a sister named Jeanne, who married Louis Brossin, lord of Méré and Sepmes, on 24 April 1529. She died in 1572.

Jean married Charlotte, daughter of Antoine de Mailly, lord of Auchy and Neuville-le-Roy, and Marie d'Yaucourt. They had a daughter, also Charlotte, who married firstly Claude des Essars, lord of Sautour, and secondly René, comte de Sansay, hereditary viscount of Poitou.

== Career ==
Jean progressed rapidly in the service of King Francis I. In 1529, he became a panetier ordinaire (pantler) in the royal household. In 1530, he was one of six knights chosen by the king to defend a pas d'armes at the arrival of Francis's bride, Eleanor of Austria. In 1534, he became a gentilhomme de la Chambre du roi and was dispatched as an ambassador to the Duchy of Ferrara. In 1538, he led an embassy to Rome and, in 1543, to Turin.

Jean played an active role in the Italian Wars. In 1544, he distinguished himself at the battle of Ceresole and the siege of Boulogne. On 1 October, he was promoted to the rank of colonel general of the infantry on both sides of the mountains, i.e., in France and Italy. He was the first person to hold this position. He was also made a member of the Order of Saint Michael. Probably around this time he was put in charge of the waters and forest of Loches.

In July 1545, Jean was the commander of the French forces at the battle of Bonchurch. On 21 January 1546, he was made grand master of the artillery. The death of Francis I and accession of Henry II on 31 March 1547 put an end to his military career. This was attributed to the substitution of Francis's mistress, Anne de Pisseleu d'Heilly, who favoured Jean, with a new one, Diane de Poitiers. Jean lost his generalship of the artillery on 11 April 1547, being replaced by Charles de Cossé, Count of Brissac. He was replaced as colonel general of the infantry on 29 April by Gaspard II de Coligny. He remained governor of Loches until he resigned the office to Honorat de Savoie, Count of Villars.

In 1552, the duke of Vendôme requested the service of Jean de Thais as a simple officer. Jean died at the siege of Hesdin on 19 December 1553 and was buried in the choir of the church of Sepmes.

The Géomance of Christopher Cattan was dedicated to him.
