= Martin du Bellay =

French nobleman and chronicler

Martin Du Bellay, Sieur de Langey (1495–1559) was a French nobleman and chronicler, and Prince of Yvetot by marriage. His memoirs of the Italian Wars form one of the most significant primary sources for the period.

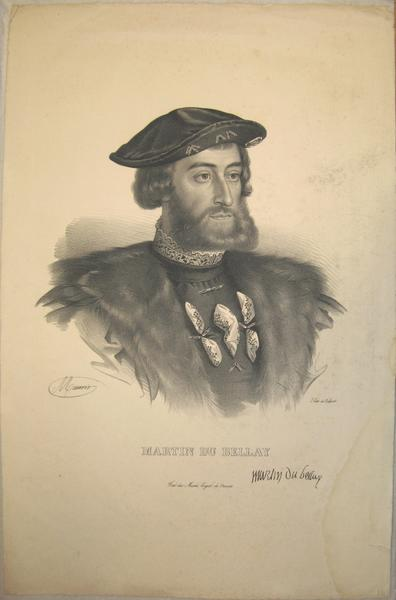
Pencil drawing of Martin Du Bellay

== Works ==
- Du Bellay, Martin, sieur de Langey. Mémoires de Martin et Guillaume du Bellay. Edited by V. L. Bourrilly and F. Vindry. 4 volumes. Paris: Société de l'histoire de France, 1908–19.
- Du Bellay, Martin, sieur de Langey, Les mémoires de Mess. Martin du Bellay, Paris (1569)
