= Claude d'Annebault =

French military officer

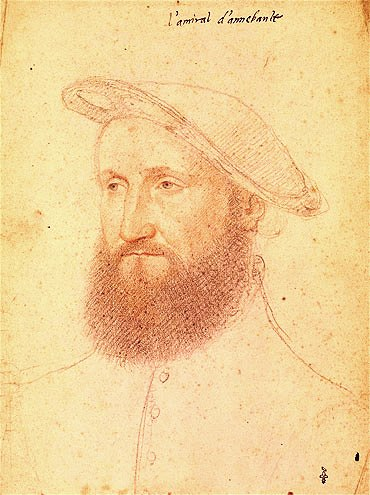
Portrait of Claude d'Annebault (school of Jean Clouet, c. 1535)

Claude d'Annebault (1495 – 2 November 1552) was a French military officer; Marshal of France (1538–52); Admiral of France (1543–1552); and Governor of Piedmont in 1541. He led the French invasion of the Isle of Wight in 1545. Annebault was governor of Normandy and a very powerful figure during the reign of King Francis.

Claude was a commissioner for the Anglo-French Treaty of Ardres, also known as the Treaty of Camp, which was signed on 7 June 1546 and a step towards the conclusion of the Italian War of 1542–1546. After a delay which the English found frustrating, Claude then visited England as a special ambassador for the peace treaty 20–30 August 1546. Four cannon at Walmer Castle burst while firing his salute. Claude wrote from London to his ally, Mary of Guise, in Scotland on 28 August, explaining his difficulties in forwarding their mutual interest.

== Family ==
Claude married Françoise de Tournemine, daughter and heiress of Georges de Tournemire, sieur de la Hunaudaye. Their only son Jean was an hostage for the Treaty of Boulogne which ended the war in Scotland in April 1550. Jean was invited to the court of Edward VI on 23 April to see the Garter Knight's communion and took part in a tournament to entertain the French ambassadors on 25 May. After the conditions of the peace were fulfilled, Jean left for Calais on 8 August 1550. Jean d'Annebault was killed at the battle of Dreux in 1562.

== In popular culture ==
In the TV series The Tudors, Claude is played by Kenneth Collard.
