= Battle of Serravalle (1544) =

1544 battle

Coordinates: 44°44′N 08°51′E

- Part of the Italian War of 1542–1546
Date	2–4 June 1544
Location	Serravalle Scrivia, Apennine Mountains
Result	Imperial-Spanish victory

Belligerents
Empire of Charles V: Spain; Holy Roman Empire	Kingdom of France; Italian mercenaries

Commanders and leaders
Alfonso d'Avalos	Pietro Strozzi (POW)

Strength
8,000 soldiers 400 horsemen	10,000 men

Casualties and losses
High	High; 5,000 men captured

The Battle of Serravalle took place on 2–4 June 1544 in Serravalle Scrivia, in the Apennine Mountains, between the Imperial-Spanish army commanded by Don Alfonso d'Avalos, Marquis del Vasto, and a force of freshly raised Italian mercenaries in French service, led by Pietro Strozzi, member of the rich and famous Florentine family of the Strozzi, and Giovan Francesco Orsini, Count of Pitigliano, during the Italian War of 1542–1546.

== Background ==
Despite the collapse of the Imperial-Spanish army under Alfonso d'Avalos at the Battle of Ceresole (Spanish: Cerisoles), the battle proved to be of little strategic significance. At the insistence of Francis I of France, the French army resumed the Siege of Carignano, where Pirro Colonna held out for several weeks. Soon after the city's surrender, the impending invasion of France itself by the forces of the Emperor Charles and Henry VIII of England, forced Francis to recall much of his army from Piedmont, leaving the Count of Enghien without the troops he needed to take Milan.

The Spaniards, holding all the strong places of Lombardy, were enabled to prevent d'Enghien from any further success.

== Battle ==
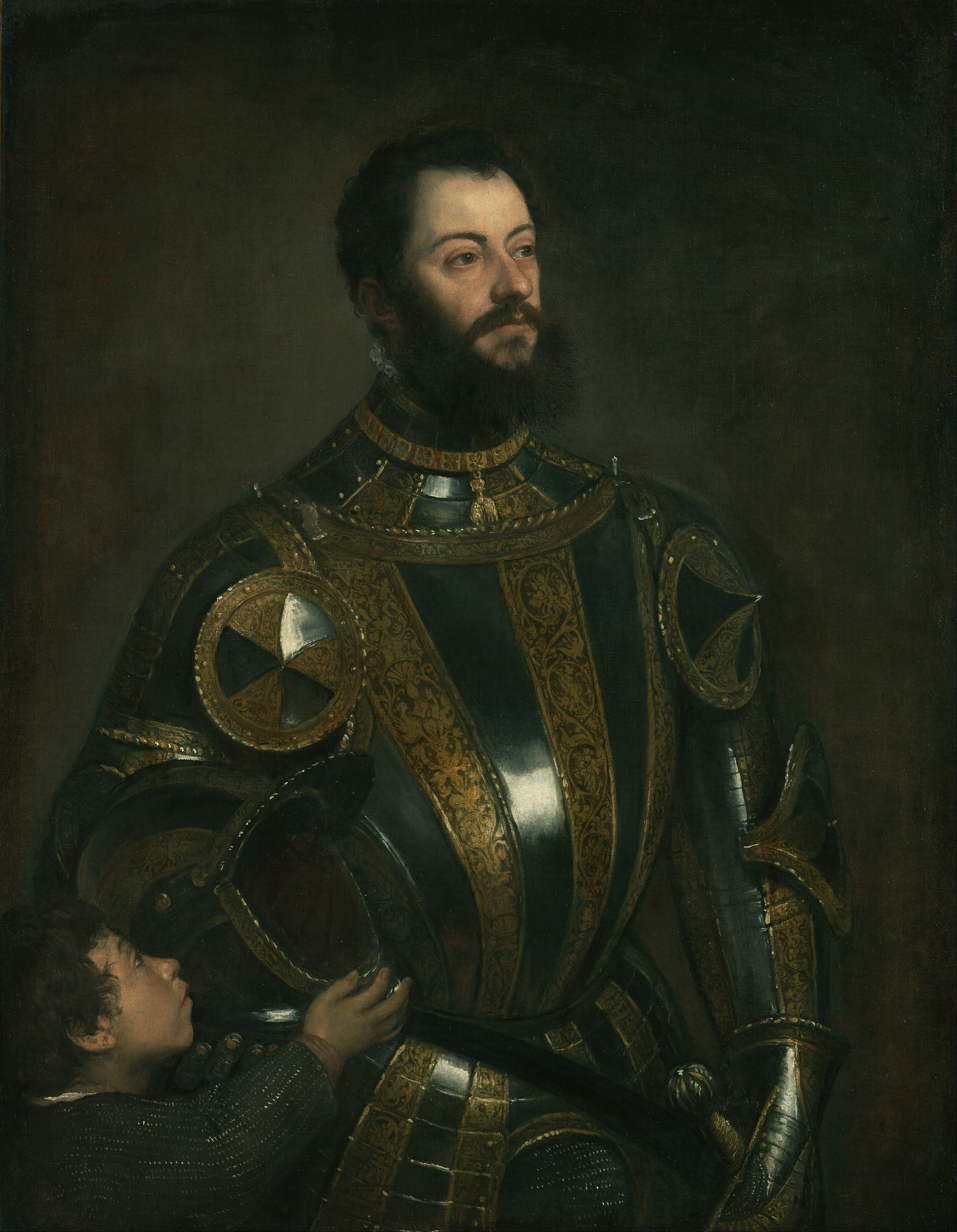
The Marquis del Vasto by Titian.

Coat of arms of the famous Florentine family of the Strozzi.

Pietro Strozzi, an Italian military leader in French service, who had collected an army of over 10,000 soldiers at Mirandola, advanced boldly to Milan, in the hopes of joining d'Enghien there, but on 2–4 June, the Imperial-Spanish army commanded by Don Alfonso d'Avalos intercepted and defeated the Franco-Italian army of Pietro Strozzi and the Count of Pitigliano. The Strozzi's army was destroyed and the Spaniards obtained the total control of the Lombardy, ending the French offensive of the François de Bourbon, Count of Enghien, to try to capture the Duchy of Milan.

== Consequences ==
The Milanese would remain in the hands of the Emperor Charles, and in the end of the war saw a return to the status-quo in northern Italy. In May, the Emperor invaded France with two armies. One of them, led by the Imperial commander Ferrante Gonzaga, Viceroy of Sicily, captured Luxembourg and moved towards Commercy and Ligny. On 8 July, Ferrante Gonzaga besieged Saint-Dizier, and the second army led by the Emperor Charles stationed in the Electorate of the Palatinate, soon joined him.

Meanwhile, Henry VIII, had sent an army of some 40,000 men to Calais under the command of Thomas Howard, Duke of Norfolk, and Charles Brandon, Duke of Suffolk.

== See also ==
- List of battles of the Italian Wars
- Siege of St. Dizier
- Sieges of Boulogne (1544–1546)
- Italian Wars
