= Charles Gonzaga =

Charles Gonzaga may refer to:

- Carlo Gonzaga of Milan (died 1456), Lord of Sabbioneta
- Carlo Gonzaga (condottiero) (1525–1566), Italian military leader
- Charles I Gonzaga (1580–1637), Lord of Montferrat, Duke of Nevers, Duke of Mayenne
- Charles II Gonzaga of Nevers,(1609–1631), son of Carlo I, married to Maria Gonzaga
- Charles II Gonzaga of Mantua and Montferrat (1629–1665), son of Charles II
- Charles IV, Duke of Mantua and Montferrat (1652–1708), son of Charles III, last ruler of Mantua
