= Hans Asper =

Swiss painter

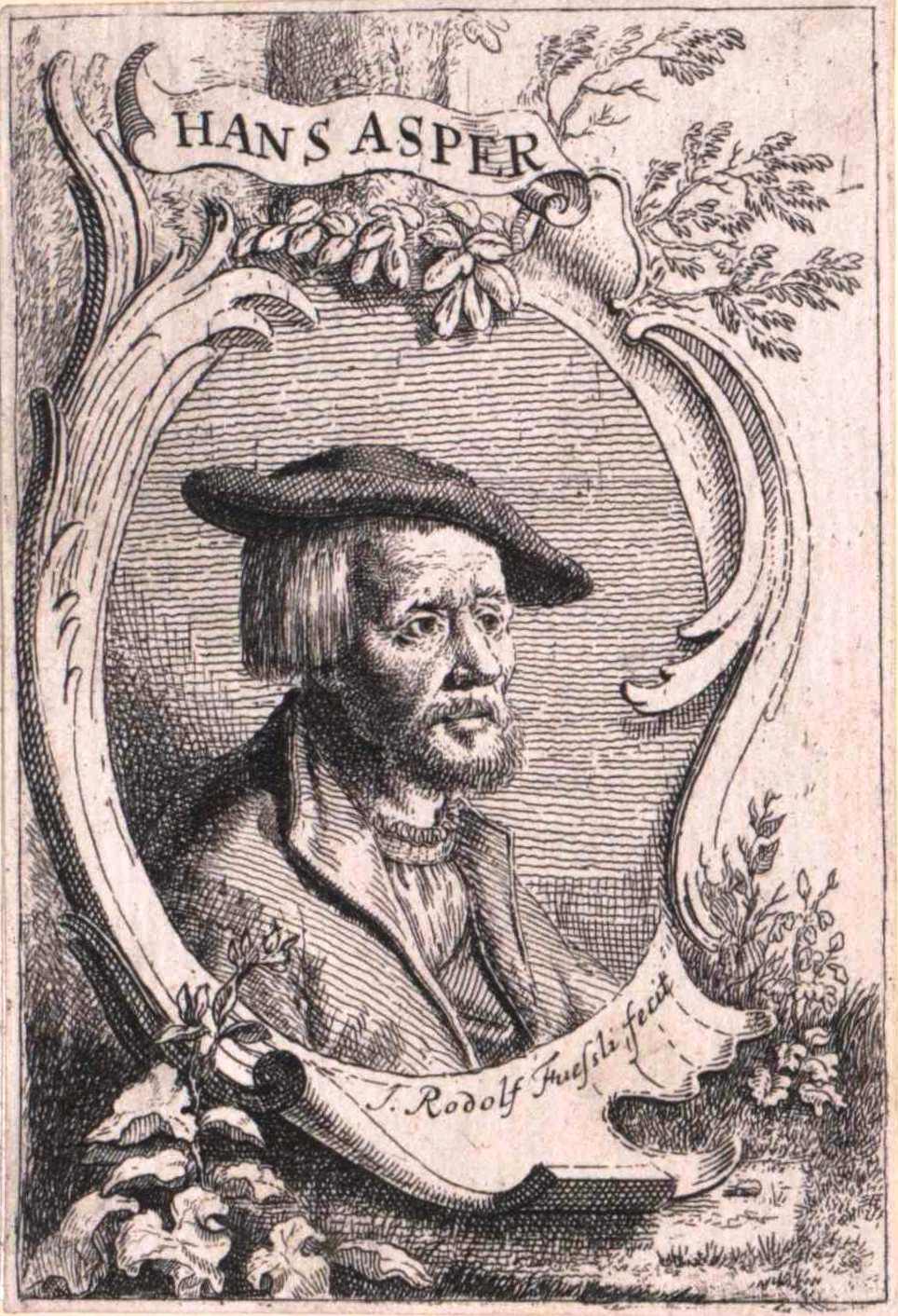
18th-century portrait of Hans Asper

Hans Asper (c. 1499 – 21 March 1571) was a Swiss painter from Zurich. He painted portraits and also worked on decorative commissions as the city’s official painter.

== Biography ==
Asper was born in Zürich around 1499. He was the son of Heinrich Asper, who came from a Zürich council family. In 1526 he married a daughter of the Zürich councillor Ludwig Nöggi. He is thought to have studied with Hans Leu the Younger and was familiar with the work of Hans Holbein the Younger at an early stage.

From 1545 he served on Zürich’s Great Council as a representative of the Meisenzunft. In 1567 the council granted him a life pension for his work, but he died in poor circumstances in 1571. Two of his sons, Hans Rudolf Asper and Rudolf Asper, also became painters.

== Works ==
Asper became known for his portraits. Around 30 portraits by him are known, dating from 1531 to 1560. His portraits often have sharply defined outlines, monochrome backgrounds, and strong colours. They usually show their subjects in profile, three-quarter or frontal view.

One of his earliest known works is a 1531 portrait of Huldrych Zwingli painted in oil on parchment. In the same year, as Zürich’s official city painter, he painted the small council chamber and the town clerk’s house. He later gilded the clock faces of St. Peter’s church tower in 1538–39 and produced façade paintings, banners, coats of arms, and topographical views for civic commissions. Much of this public work is now lost, apart from two coats of arms at Kyburg Castle and Laufen Castle.

== Gallery ==
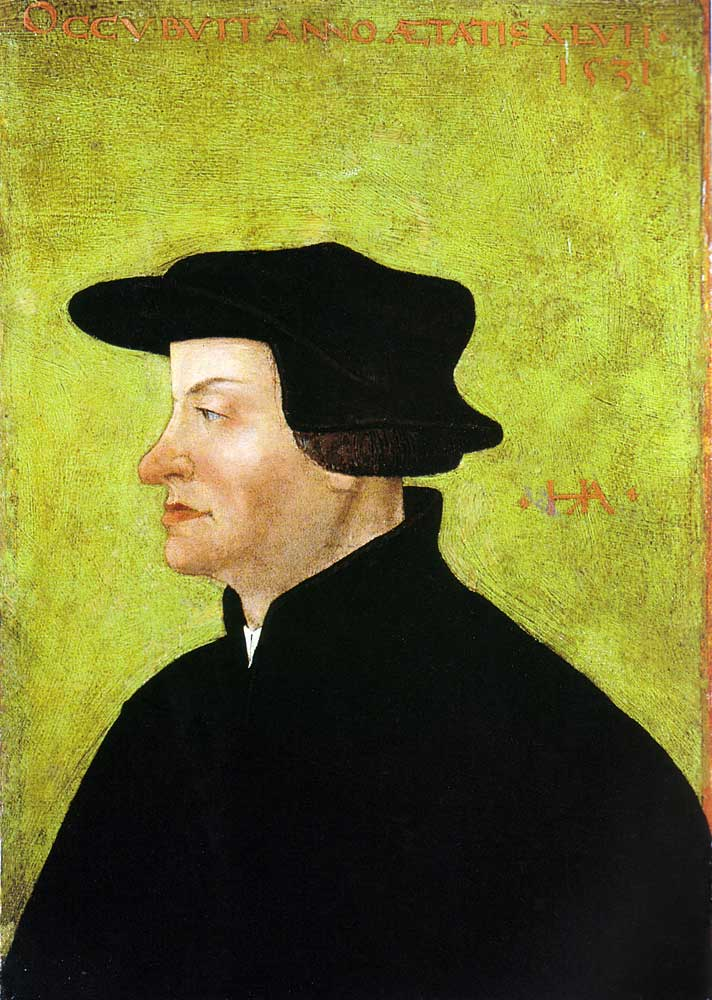
Huldrych Zwingli, 1531

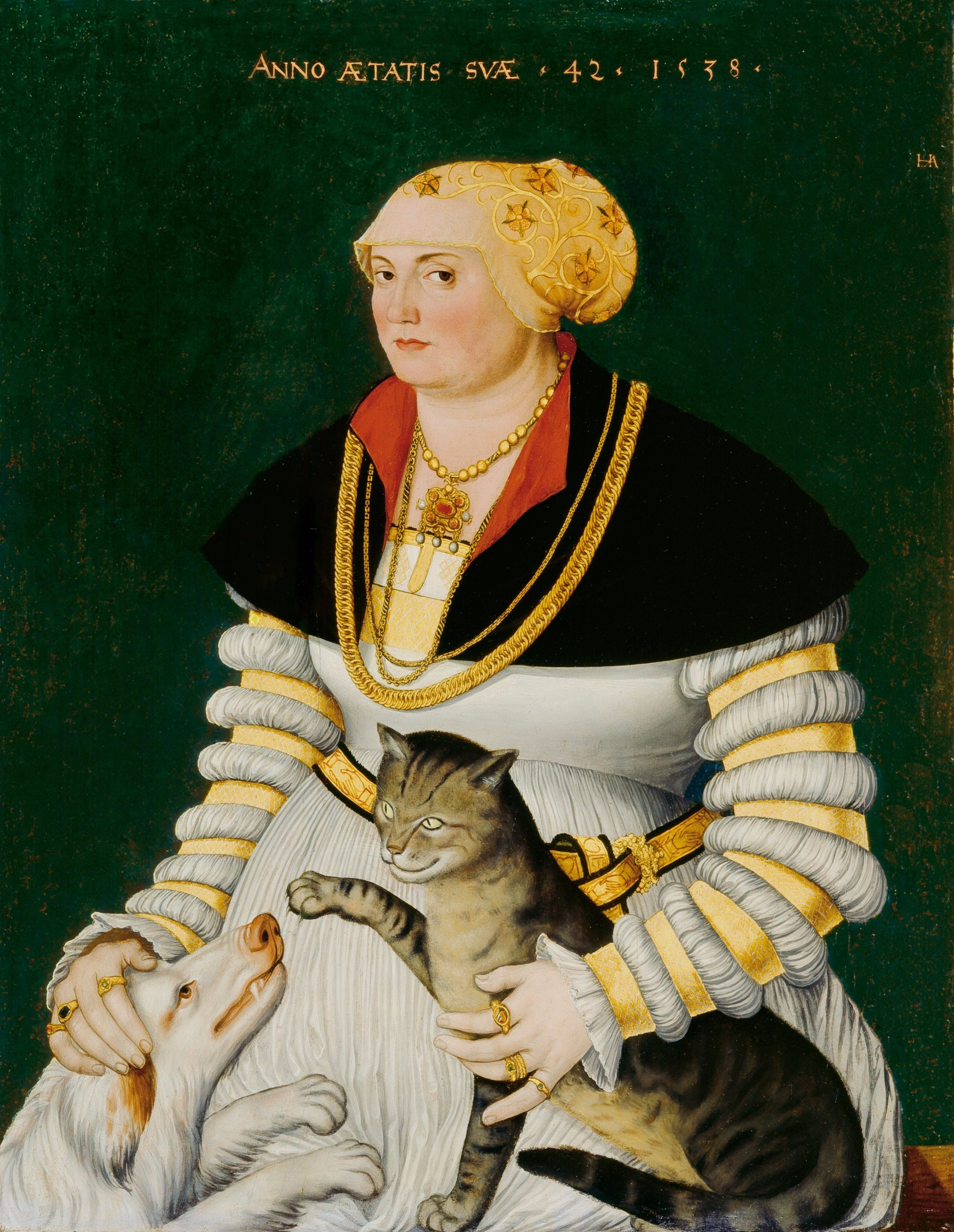
Cleophea Holzhalb, 1538

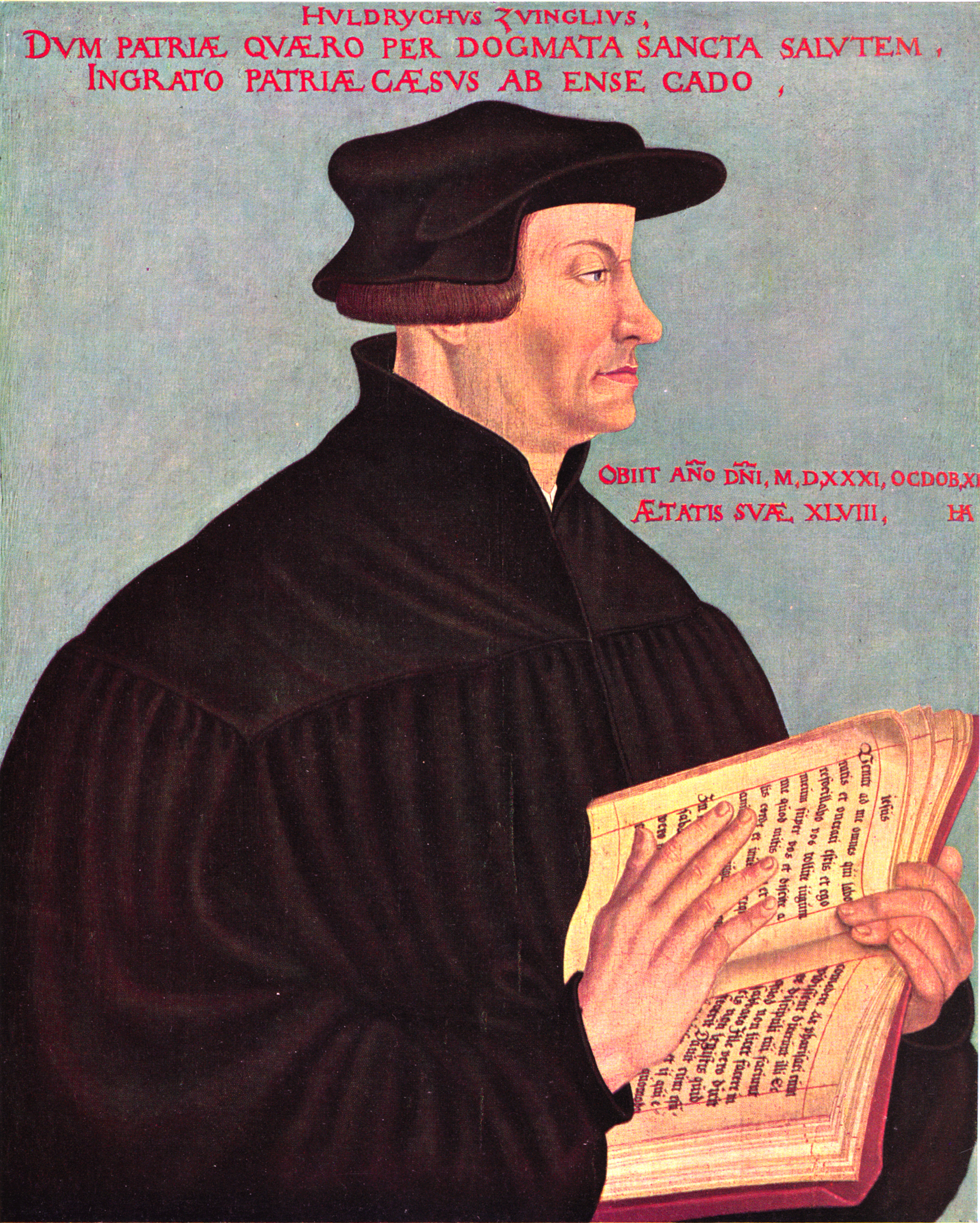
Huldrych Zwingli, 1549

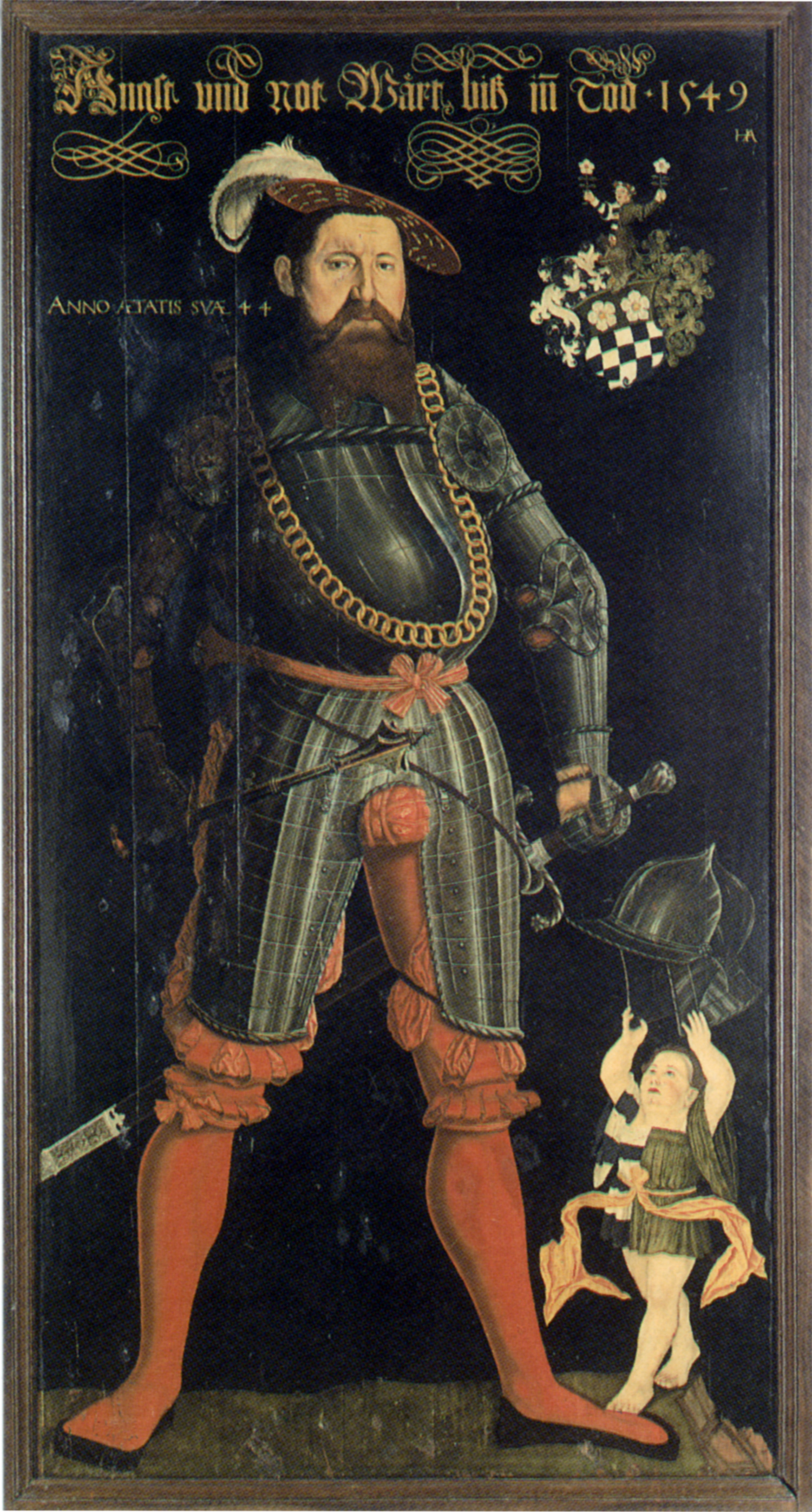
Wilhelm Frölich, 1549, Asper's only full-length portrait

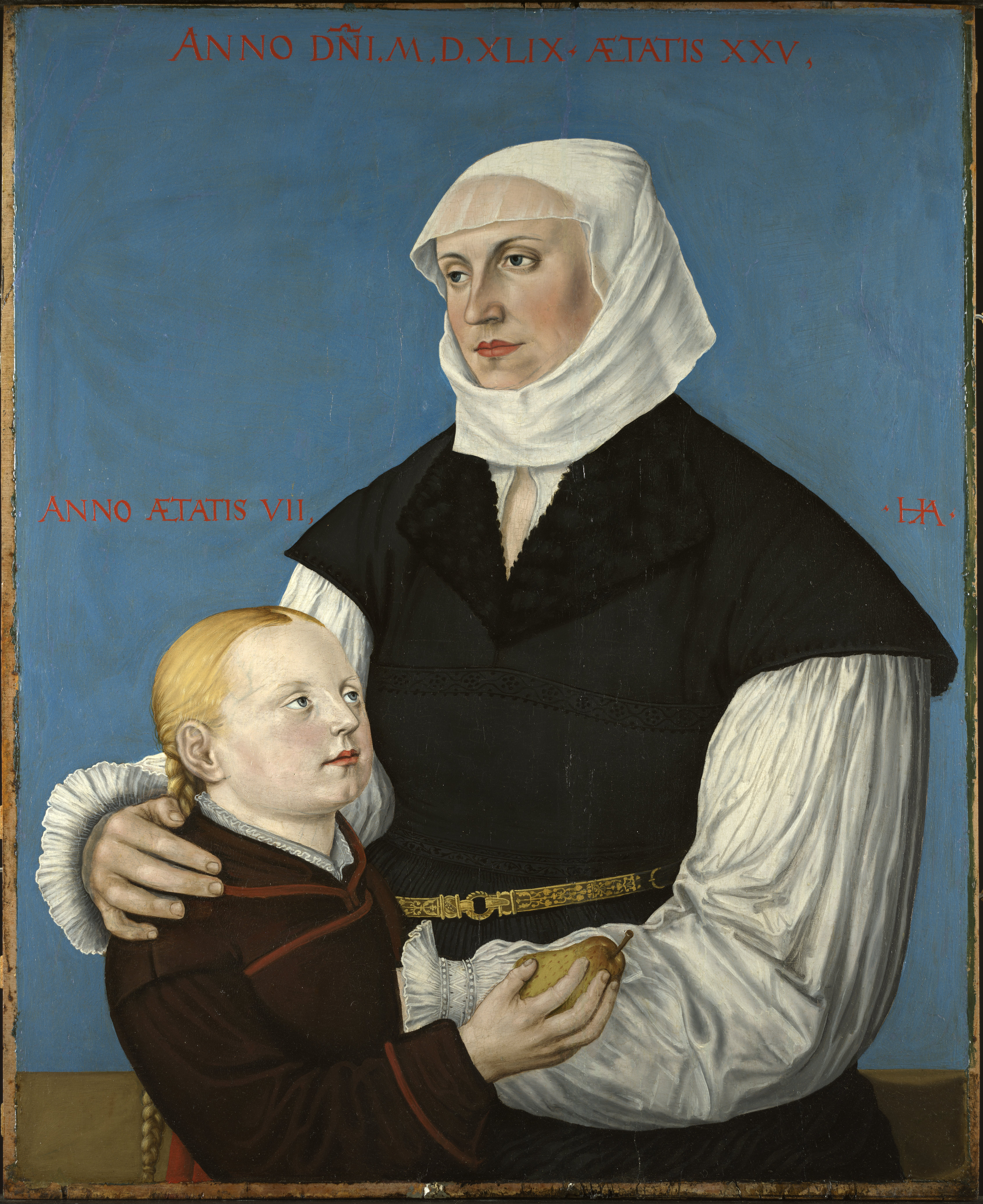
Regula Gwalther Zwingli and Anna Gwalther, 1549, Huldrych Zwingli's daughter and granddaughter

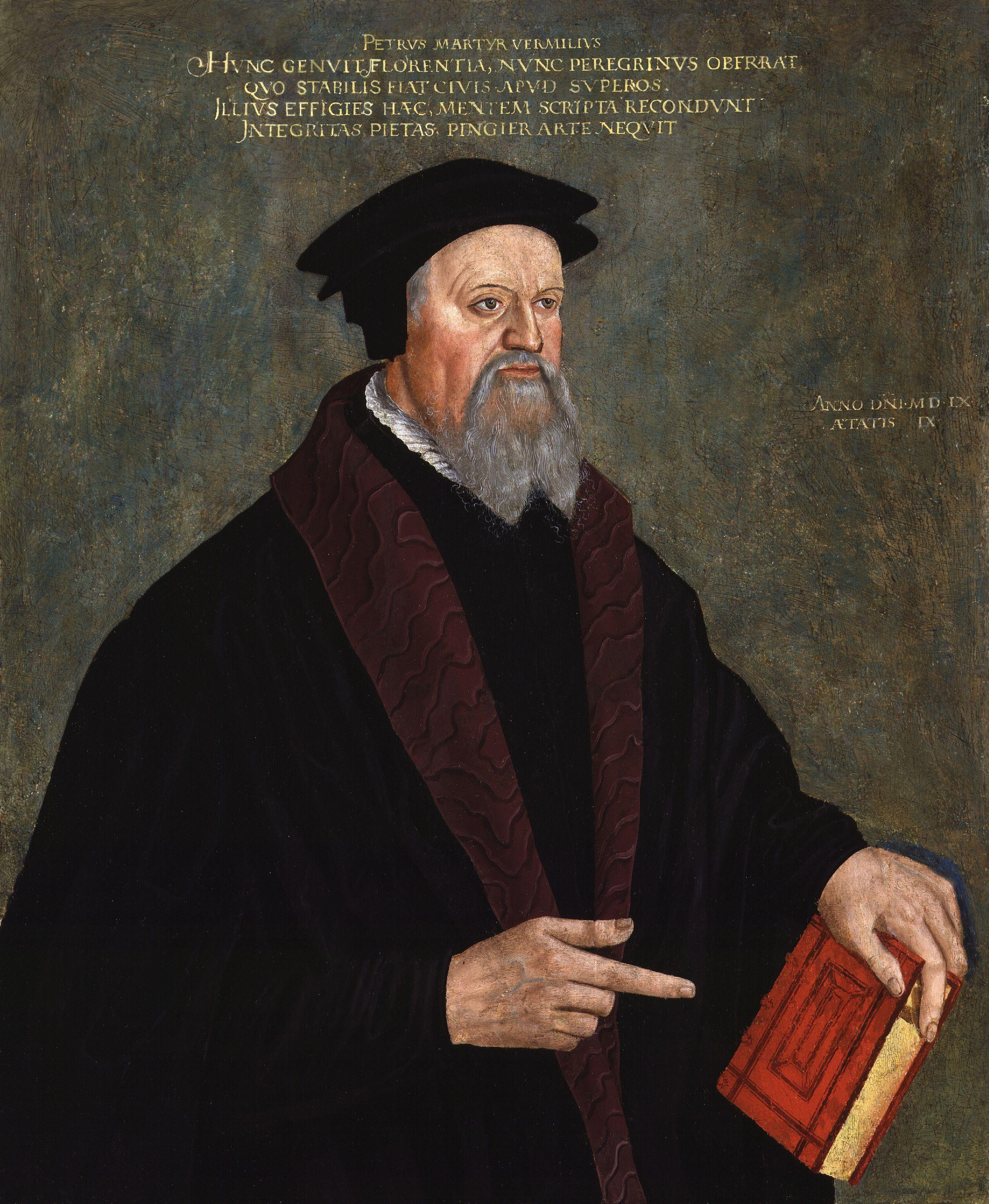
Pietro Martire Vermigli, 1560

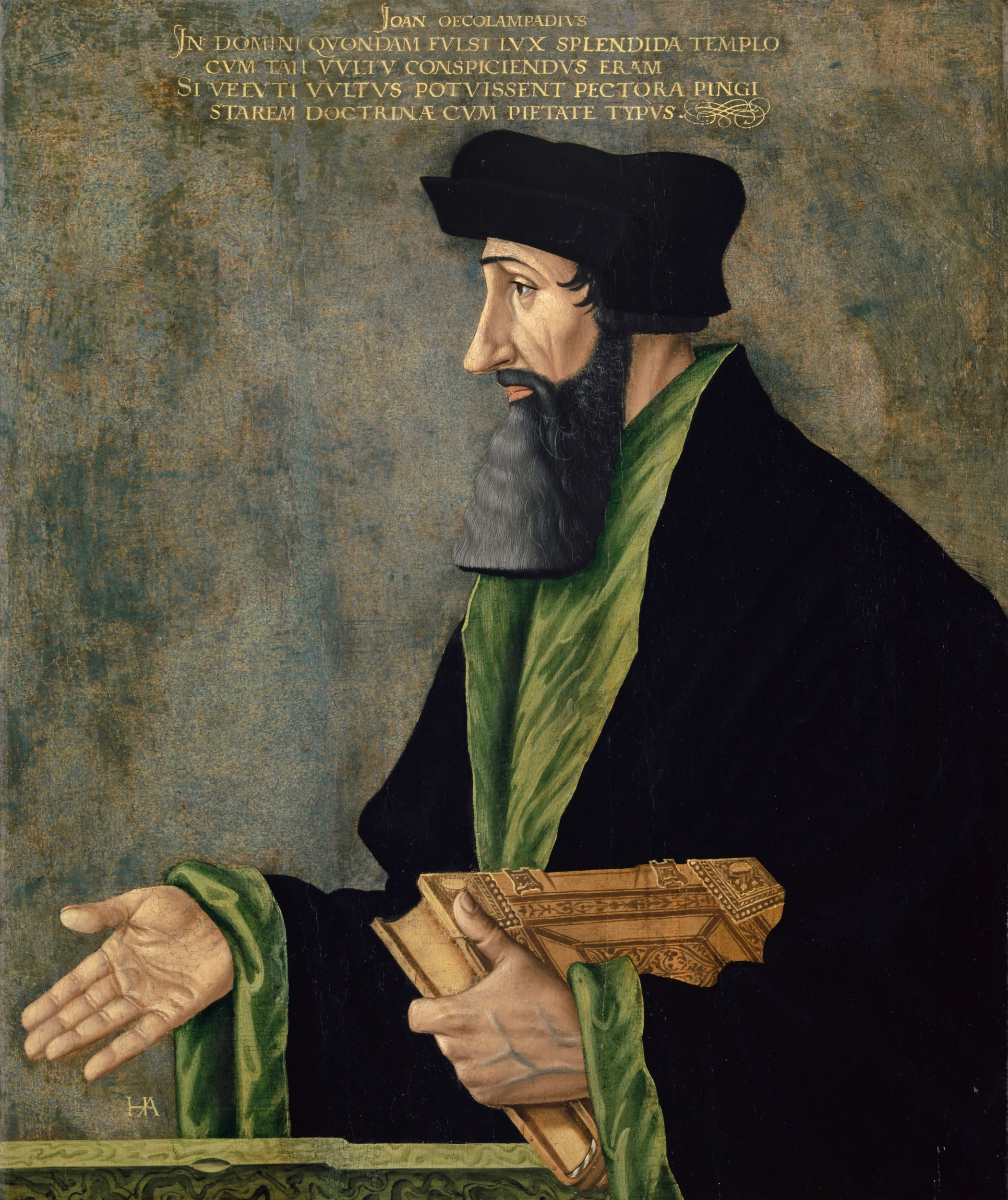
Johannes Oekolampad
