= Battle of Ceresole =

1544 battle in Piedmont, Italy

- Part of the Italian War of 1542–1546
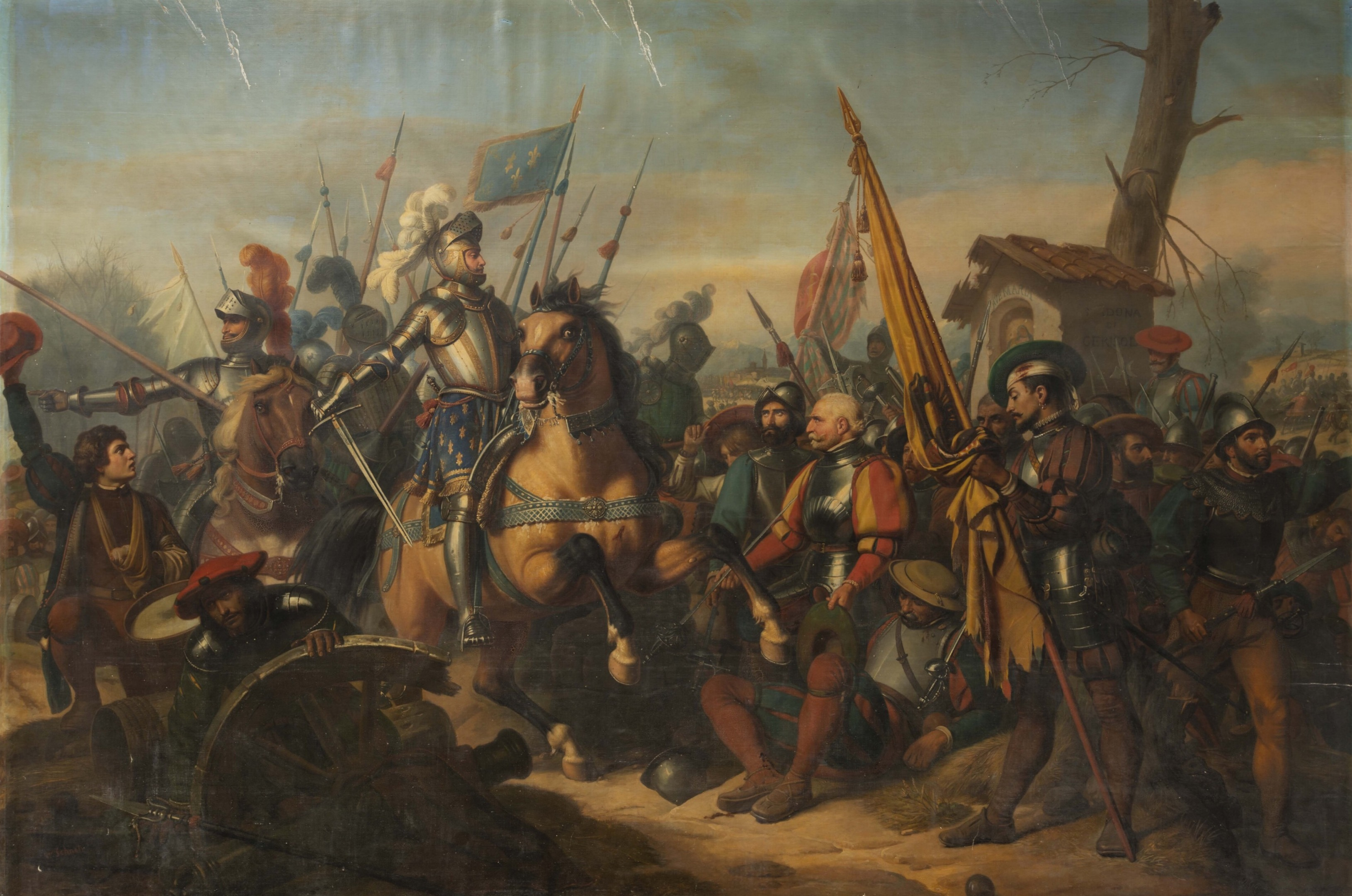
- 1836–1837 painting of François, Count of Enghien with prisoners of war at the battle's end
Date	14 April 1544
Location	Near Ceresole d'Alba, southeast of Turin, present-day Italy 44.805°N 7.845°E
Result	French victory

Belligerents
Kingdom of France	Holy Roman Empire; Spain

Commanders and leaders
François de Bourbon	Alfonso d'Avalos

Strength
13,700–15,800 infantry 2,000 cavalry ~20 guns	19,000–20,000 infantry 800–900 cavalry ~20 guns

Casualties and losses
1,000–1,500 dead or wounded	9,000–10,000 dead or wounded 3,000 captured
- Location within Alps Battle of Ceresole (Italy)

The Battle of Ceresole (Italian pronunciation: [tʃereˈzɔːle]; also Cérisoles) took place on 14 April 1544, during the Italian War of 1542–1546, outside the village of Ceresole d'Alba in the Piedmont region of Italy. A French army, commanded by François de Bourbon, Count of Enghien, defeated the combined forces of the Holy Roman Empire and Spain, commanded by Alfonso d'Avalos d'Aquino, Marquis del Vasto. Despite having inflicted substantial casualties on the Imperial troops, the French subsequently failed to exploit their victory by taking Milan.

Enghien and d'Avalos had arranged their armies along two parallel ridges; because of the topography of the battlefield, many of the individual actions of the battle were uncoordinated. The battle opened with several hours of skirmishing between opposing bands of arquebusiers and an ineffectual artillery exchange, after which d'Avalos ordered a general advance. In the center, Imperial landsknechts clashed with French and Swiss infantry, with both sides suffering terrific casualties. In the southern part of the battlefield, Italian infantry in Imperial service were harried by French cavalry attacks and withdrew after learning that the Imperial troops of the center had been defeated. In the north, meanwhile, the French infantry line crumbled, and Enghien led a series of ineffectual and costly cavalry charges against Spanish and German infantry before the latter were forced to surrender by the arrival of the victorious Swiss and French infantry from the center.

Ceresole was one of the few pitched battles during the latter half of the Italian Wars. Known among military historians chiefly for the "great slaughter" that occurred when columns of intermingled arquebusiers and pikemen met in the center, it also demonstrates the continuing role of traditional heavy cavalry on a battlefield largely dominated by the emerging pike and shot infantry.

== Prelude ==
The opening of the war in northern Italy had been marked by the fall of Nice to a combined Franco-Ottoman fleet in August 1543; meanwhile, Imperial-Spanish forces had advanced from Lombardy towards Turin, which had been left in French hands at the end of the previous war in 1538. By the winter of 1543–1544, a stalemate had developed in the Piedmont between the French, under the Sieur de Boutières, and the Imperial army, under d'Avalos. The French position, centered on Turin, reached outward to a series of fortified towns: Pinerolo, Carmagnola, Savigliano, Susa, Moncalieri, Villanova, Chivasso, and a number of others; d'Avalos, meanwhile, controlled a group of fortresses on the periphery of the French territory: Mondovì, Asti, Casale Monferrato, Vercelli, and Ivrea. The two armies occupied themselves primarily with attacking each other's outlying strongholds. Boutières seized San Germano Vercellese, near Vercelli, and laid siege to Ivrea; d'Avalos, meanwhile, captured Carignano, only fifteen miles south of Turin, and proceeded to garrison and fortify it.

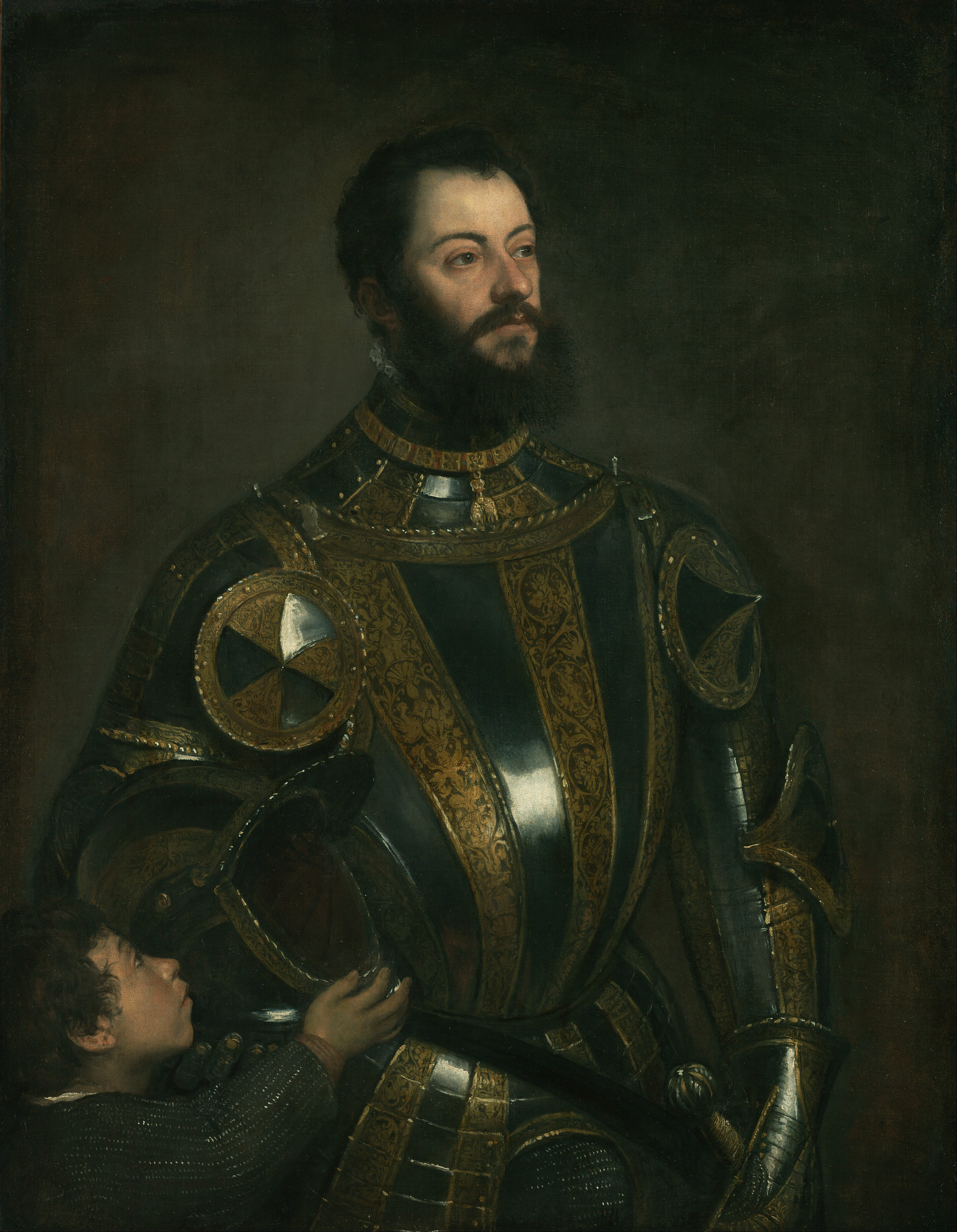
Portrait of Alfonso d'Avalos, Marchese del Vasto, in Armor with a Page (oil on canvas by Titian, c. 1533)

As the two armies returned to winter quarters, Francis I of France replaced Boutières with François de Bourbon, Count of Enghien, a prince with no experience commanding an army. Francis also sent additional troops to the Piedmont, including several hundred heavy cavalry, some companies of French infantry from Dauphiné and Languedoc, and a force of quasi-Swiss from Gruyères. In January 1544, Enghien laid siege to Carignano, which was defended by Imperial troops under the command of Pirro Colonna. The French were of the opinion that d'Avalos would be forced to attempt a relief of the besieged city, at which point he could be forced into a battle; but as such pitched battles were viewed as very risky undertakings, Enghien sent Blaise de Lasseran-Massencôme, seigneur de Montluc, to Paris to ask Francis for permission to fight one. Montluc apparently convinced Francis to give his assent—contingent on the agreement of Enghien's captains—over the objections of the Comte de Saint-Pol, who complained that a defeat would leave France exposed to an invasion by d'Avalos's troops at a time when Charles V and Henry VIII of England were expected to attack Picardy. Montluc, returning to Italy, brought with him nearly a hundred volunteers from among the young noblemen of the court, including Gaspard de Coligny.

D'Avalos, having waited for the arrival of a large body of landsknechts dispatched by Holy Roman Emperor Charles V, set off from Asti towards Carignano. His total force included 12,500–18,000 infantry, of which perhaps 4,000 were arquebusiers or musketeers; he was only able to gather about 800–1,000 cavalry, of which less than 200 were gendarmes. Grand imperial admiral Andrea Doria, who had been advising d'Avalos due to his own career on land, urged him not to seek a pitched battle, warning that his army was critically weaker in cavalry and composed by many unexperienced troops. However d'Avalos, being short of funds to pay his troops and needing a blow of effect, considered his disadvantage to be compensated by the grit of his veteran infantry and the large number of arquebusiers in its ranks.

Enghien, having learned of the Imperial advance, left a blocking force at Carignano and assembled the remainder of his army at Carmagnola, blocking d'Avalos's route to the besieged city. The French cavalry, shadowing d'Avalos's movements, discovered that the Imperial forces were headed directly for the French position; on 10 April, d'Avalos occupied the village of Ceresole d'Alba, about five miles (8.0 km) southeast of the French. Enghien's officers urged him to attack immediately, but he was determined to fight on ground of his own choosing; on the morning of 14 April, the French marched from Carmagnola to a position some three miles (4.8 km) to the southeast and awaited d'Avalos's arrival. Enghien and Montluc felt that the open ground would give the French cavalry a significant tactical advantage. By this point, the French army consisted of around 11,000–13,000 infantry, 600 light cavalry, and 900–1,250 heavy cavalry; Enghien and d'Avalos each had about twenty pieces of artillery. The battle came at a fortunate time for Enghien, as his Swiss troops were—as they had before the Battle of Bicocca—threatening to march home if they were not paid; the news of the impending battle restored some calm to their ranks.

== Battle ==
=== Dispositions ===
The initial dispositions of the opposing armies; the French troops are shown in blue and the Imperial troops in red.

Enghien's troops were positioned along the crest of a ridge that was higher in the center than on either side, preventing the wings of the French army from seeing each other. The French army was divided into the traditional "battle", "vanward", and "rearward" corps, corresponding to the center and right and left wings of the French line. On the far right of the French position was a body of light cavalry, consisting of three companies under Des Thermes, Bernadino, and Mauré, with a total strength of around 450–500 men. To their left was the French infantry under De Tais, numbering around 4,000, and, farther to the left, a squadron of 80 gendarmes under Boutières, who was nominally the commander of the entire French right wing. The center of the French line was formed by thirteen companies of veteran Swiss, numbering about 4,000, under the joint command of William Frülich of Soleure and a captain named St. Julian. To their left was Enghien himself with three companies of heavy cavalry, a company of light horse, and the volunteers from Paris—in total, around 450 troopers. The left wing was composed of two columns of infantry, consisting of 3,000 of the recruits from Gruyères and 2,000 Italians, all under the command of Sieur Descroz. On the extreme left of the line were about 400 mounted archers deployed as light cavalry; they were commanded by Dampierre, who was also given command of the entire French left wing.

The Imperial line formed up on a similar ridge facing the French position. On the far left, facing Des Thermes, were 300 Florentine light cavalry under Rodolfo Baglioni; flanking them to the right were 6,000 Italian infantry under Ferrante Sanseverino, Prince of Salerno. In the center were the 7,000 landsknechte under the command of Eriprando Madruzzo. To their right was d'Avalos himself, together with the small force of about 200 heavy cavalry under Carlo Gonzaga. The Imperial right wing was composed of around 5,000 German and Spanish infantry under Ramón de Cardona; they were flanked, on the far right, by 300 Italian light cavalry under Philip de Lannoy, Prince of Sulmona.

Order of battle at Ceresole (listed from north to south along the battlefield)
French (François de Bourbon, Count of Enghien)			Spanish–Imperial (Alfonso d'Avalos d'Aquino, Marquis del Vasto)		
Unit	Strength	Commander	Unit	Strength	Commander
Light cavalry	~400	Dampierre	Neapolitan light cavalry	~300	Philip de Lannoy, Prince of Sulmona
Italian infantry	~2,000	Descroz	Spanish and German infantry	~5,000	Ramón de Cardona
Gruyères infantry	~3,000	Descroz	Spanish and German infantry	~5,000	Ramón de Cardona
Heavy cavalry	~450	François de Bourbon, Count of Enghien	Heavy cavalry	~200	Carlo Gonzaga
Swiss	~4,000	William Frülich of Soleure and St. Julian	Landsknechte	~7,000	Eriprando Madruzzo
Heavy cavalry	~80	Sieur de Boutières	Landsknechte	~7,000	Eriprando Madruzzo
French (Gascon) infantry	~4,000	De Tais	Italian infantry	~6,000	Ferrante Sanseverino, Prince of Salerno
Light cavalry	~450–500	Des Thermes	Florentine light cavalry	~300	Rodolfo Baglioni

=== Initial moves ===
As d'Avalos's troops, marching from Ceresole, began to arrive on the battlefield, both armies attempted to conceal their numbers and position from the other; Enghien had ordered the Swiss to lie on the ground behind the crest of the ridge, while only the left wing of the Imperial army was initially visible to the French. D'Avalos sent out parties of arquebusiers in an attempt to locate the French flanks; Enghien, in turn, detached about 800 arquebusiers under Montluc to delay the Imperial advance. The skirmishing between the arquebusiers continued for almost four hours; Martin Du Bellay, observing the engagement, described it as "a pretty sight for anyone who was in a safe place and unemployed, for they played off on each other all the ruses and stratagems of petty war." As the extent of each army's position was revealed, Enghien and d'Avalos both brought up their artillery. The ensuing cannonade continued for several hours, but had little effect because of the distance and the considerable cover available to the troops on both sides.

The first phase of the battle, including the Imperial advance, the rout of the Florentine cavalry, the division of the landsknechts, and the advance and retreat of the Spanish heavy cavalry.

The skirmishing finally came to an end when it seemed that Imperial cavalry would attack the French arquebusiers in the flank; Montluc then requested assistance from Des Thermes, who advanced with his entire force of light cavalry. D'Avalos, observing the French movement, ordered a general advance along the entire Imperial line. At the southern end of the battlefield, the French light cavalry drove Baglioni's Florentines back into Sanseverino's advancing infantry, and then proceeded to charge directly into the infantry column. The Italian formation held, and Des Thermes himself was wounded and captured; but by the time Sanseverino had dealt with the resulting disorder and was ready to advance again, the fight in the center had already been decided.

=== "A wholesale slaughter" ===
The French infantry—mostly Gascons—had meanwhile started down the slope towards Sanseverino. Montluc, noting that the disorder of the Italians had forced them to a standstill, suggested that De Tais attack Madruzzo's advancing column of landsknechte instead; this advice was accepted, and the French formation turned left in an attempt to strike the landsknechte in the flank. Madruzzo responded by splitting his column into two separate portions, one of which moved to intercept the French while the other continued up the slope towards the Swiss waiting at the crest.

The pike and shot infantry had by this time adopted a system in which arquebusiers and pikemen were intermingled in combined units; both the French and the Imperial infantry contained men with firearms interspersed in the larger columns of pikemen. This combination of pikes and small arms made close-quarters fighting extremely bloody. The mixed infantry was normally placed in separate clusters, with the arquebusiers on the flanks of a central column of pikemen; at Ceresole, however, the French infantry had been arranged with the first rank of pikemen followed immediately by a rank of arquebusiers, who were ordered to hold their fire until the two columns met. Montluc, who claimed to have devised the scheme, wrote that:

In this way we should kill all their captains in the front rank. But we found that they were as ingenious as ourselves, for behind their first line of pikes they had put pistoleers. Neither side fired till we were touching—and then there was a wholesale slaughter: every shot told: the whole front rank on each side went down.

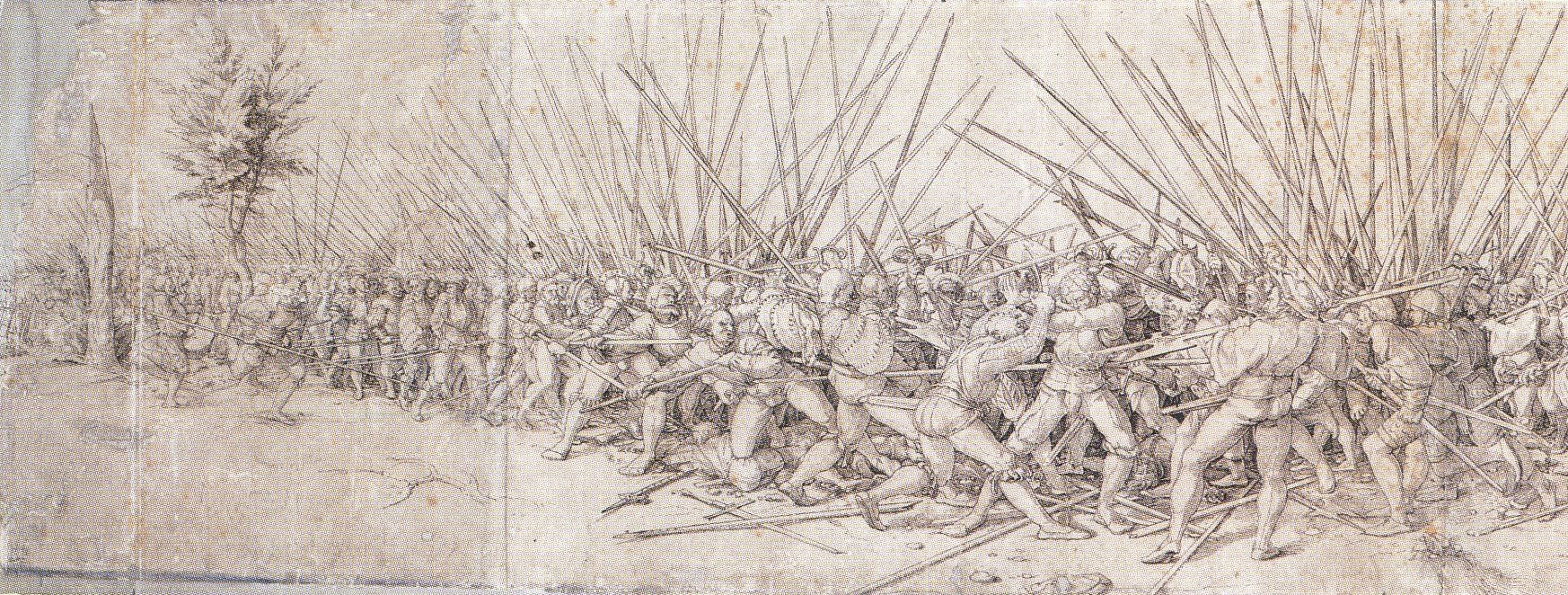
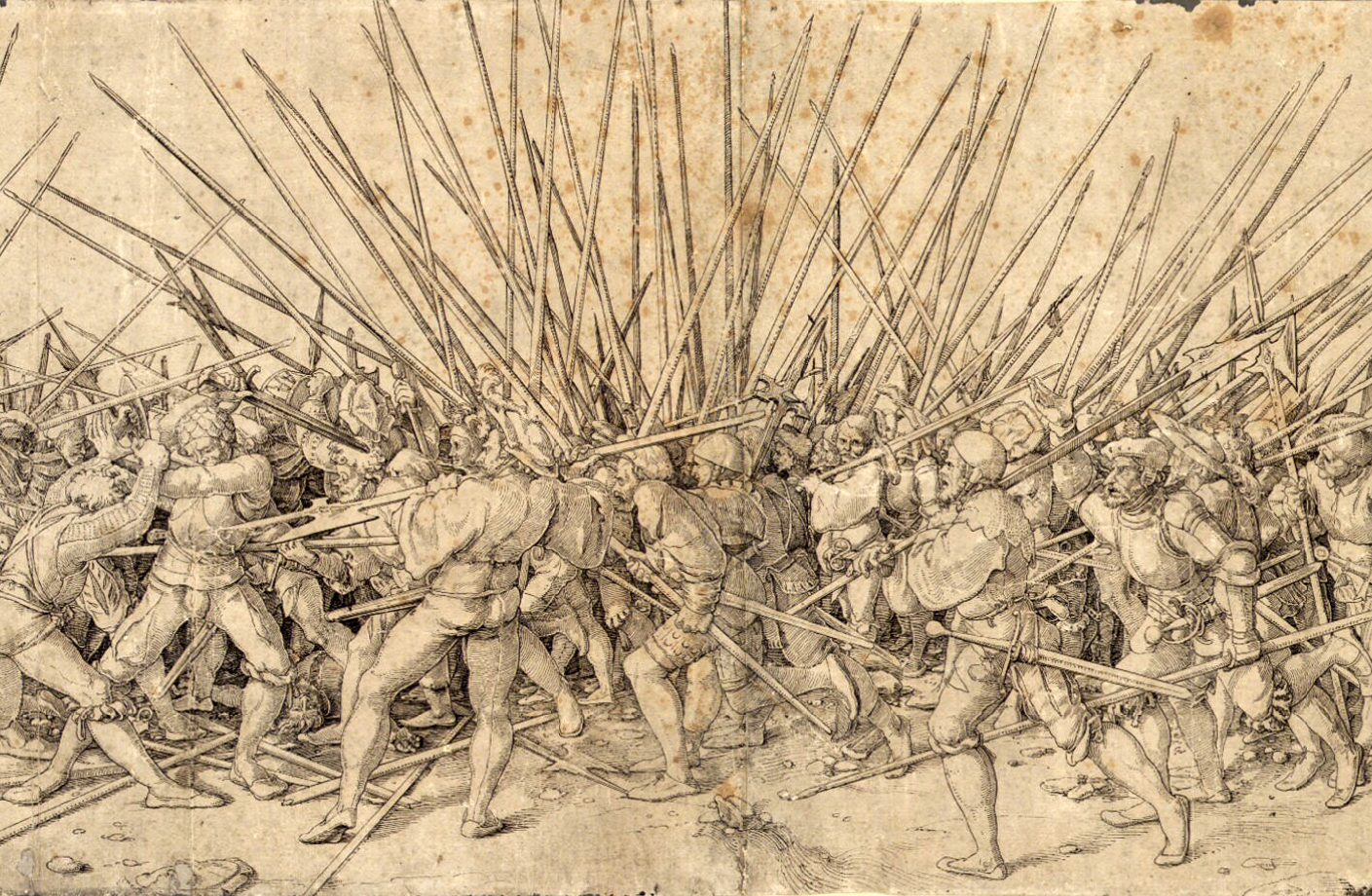
Swiss mercenaries and landsknechte engaged in a push of pike (engravings by Hans Holbein the Younger, early 16th century)

The Swiss, seeing the French engage one of the two columns of landsknechte, finally descended to meet the other, which had been slowly moving up the hillside. Both masses of infantry remained locked in a push of pike until the squadron of heavy cavalry under Boutières charged into the landsknechts' flank, shattering their formation and driving them down the slope. The Imperial heavy cavalry, which had been on the landsknechts' right, and which had been ordered by d'Avalos to attack the Swiss, recoiled from the pikes and fled to the rear, leaving Carlo Gonzaga to be taken prisoner.

The Swiss and Gascon infantry proceeded to slaughter the remaining landsknechte—whose tight order precluded a rapid retreat—as they attempted to withdraw from the battlefield. The road to Ceresole was littered with corpses; the Swiss, in particular, showed no mercy, as they wished to avenge the mistreatment of the Swiss garrison of Mondovì the previous November. Most of the landsknechts' officers were killed; and while contemporary accounts probably exaggerate the numbers of the dead, it is clear that the German infantry had ceased to exist as a fighting force. Seeing this, Sanseverino decided that the battle was lost and marched away to Asti with the bulk of the Italian infantry and the remnants of Baglioni's Florentine cavalry; the French light cavalry, meanwhile, joined in the pursuit of the landsknechts.

=== Engagements in the north ===
On the northern end of the battlefield, events had unfolded quite differently. Dampierre's cavalry routed Lannoy's company of light horse; the Italians and the contingent from Gruyères, meanwhile, broke and fled—leaving their officers to be killed—without offering any real resistance to the advancing Imperial infantry. As Cardona's infantry moved past the original French line, Enghien descended on it with the entire body of heavy cavalry under his command; the subsequent engagement took place on the reverse slope of the ridge, out of sight of the rest of the battlefield.

The second phase of the battle, including the rout of the Neapolitan cavalry and the landsknechts, Sanseverino's withdrawal, Enghien's cavalry attacks, the retreat of the Spanish-German infantry, and the return of the French and Swiss infantry from Ceresole.

On the first charge, Enghien's cavalry penetrated a corner of the Imperial formation, pushing through to the rear and losing some of the volunteers from Paris. As Cardona's ranks closed again, the French cavalry turned and made a second charge under heavy arquebus fire; this was far more costly, and again failed to break the Imperial column. Enghien, now joined by Dampierre's light cavalry, made a third charge, which again failed to achieve a decisive result; fewer than a hundred of the French gendarmes remained afterwards. Enghien believed the battle to be lost—according to Montluc, he intended to stab himself, "which ancient Romans might do, but not good Christians"—when St. Julian, the Swiss commander, arrived from the center of the battlefield and reported that the Imperial forces there had been routed.

The news of the landsknechts' defeat reached Cardona's troops at about the same time that it had reached Enghien; the Imperial column turned and retreated back towards its original position. Enghien followed closely with the remainder of his cavalry; he was soon reinforced by a company of Italian mounted arquebusiers, which had been stationed at Racconigi and had started towards the battlefield after hearing the initial artillery exchange. These arquebusiers, dismounting to fire and then remounting, were able to harass the Imperial column sufficiently to slow its retreat. Meanwhile, the French and Swiss infantry of the center, having reached Ceresole, had turned about and returned to the battlefield; Montluc, who was with them, writes:

When we heard at Ceresole that M. d'Enghien wanted us, both the Swiss and we Gascons turned toward him—I never saw two battalions form up so quick—we got into rank again actually as we ran along, side by side. The enemy was going off at quick march, firing salvos of arquebuses, and keeping off our horse, when we saw them. And when they descried us only 400 paces away, and our cavalry making ready to charge, they threw down their pikes and surrendered to the horsemen. You might see fifteen or twenty of them round a man-at-arms, pressing about him and asking for quarter, for fear of us of the infantry, who were wanting to cut all their throats.

Perhaps as many as half of the Imperial infantry were killed as they were attempting to surrender; the remainder, about 3,150 men, were taken prisoner. A few, including the Baron of Seisneck, who had commanded the German infantry contingents, managed to escape.

== Aftermath ==
The casualties of the battle were unusually high, even by the standards of the time, and are estimated at 28 percent of the total number of troops engaged. The smallest numbers given for the Imperial dead in contemporary accounts are between 5,000 and 6,000, although some French sources give figures as high as 12,000. A large number of officers were killed, particularly among the landsknechts; many of those who survived were taken prisoner, including Ramón de Cardona, Carlo Gonzaga, and Eriprando Madruzzo. The French casualties were smaller, but numbered at least 1,500 to 2,000. These included many of the officers of the Gascon and Gruyères infantry contingents, as well as a large portion of the gendarmerie that had followed Enghien. The only French prisoner of note was Des Thermes, who had been carried along with Sanseverino's retreating Italians.

Despite the collapse of the Imperial army, the battle proved to be of little strategic significance. At the insistence of Francis I, the French army resumed the siege of Carignano, where Colonna held out for several weeks. Soon after the city's surrender, Enghien was forced to send twenty-three companies of Italian and Gascon infantry—and nearly half his heavy cavalry—to Picardy, which had been invaded by Charles V. Meanwhile, Doria gathered reinforcements from Viceroy of Naples Pedro de Toledo and Cosimo I de' Medici, which he sent to Genoa and directed to Milan in order to reinforce the city. Left without a real army, Enghien was unable to capture Milan. For his part, d'Avalos routed a fresh force of Italian infantry under Pietro Strozzi and the Count of Pitigliano at the Battle of Serravalle. The end of the war saw a return to the status quo in northern Italy.

== Historiography ==
A number of detailed contemporary accounts of the battle have survived. Among the French chronicles are the narratives of Martin Du Bellay and Blaise de Montluc, both of whom were present at the scene. The Sieur de Tavannes, who accompanied Enghien, also makes some mention of the events in his memoirs. The most extensive account from the Imperial side is that of Paolo Giovio. Despite a number of inconsistencies with other accounts, it provides, according to historian Charles Oman, "valuable notes on points neglected by all the French narrators".

The interest of modern military historians in the battle has centered primarily on the role of small arms and the resulting carnage among the infantry in the center. The arrangement of pikemen and arquebusiers used was regarded as too costly, and was not tried again; in subsequent battles, arquebuses were used primarily for skirmishing and from the flanks of larger formations of pikemen. Ceresole is also of interest as a demonstration of the continuing role of traditional heavy cavalry on the battlefield. Despite the failure of Enghien's charges—the French, according to Bert Hall, held to their belief in "the effectiveness of unaided heavy cavalry to break disciplined formations"—a small body of gendarmes had been sufficient, in the center, to rout infantry columns that were already engaged with other infantry. Beyond this tactical utility, another reason for cavalry's continued importance is evident from the final episode of the battle: the French gendarmes were the only troops who could reasonably be expected to accept an opponent's surrender, as the Swiss and French infantry had no inclination towards taking prisoners. The cavalry was, according to Hall, "almost intuitively expected to heed these entreaties without question".

== See also ==
- French minesweeper Cerisoles, a ship named after the battle, built in Canada and lost on its maiden voyage in 1918
