= Wilhelm Frölich =

Swiss military commander (c. 1492 – 1562)

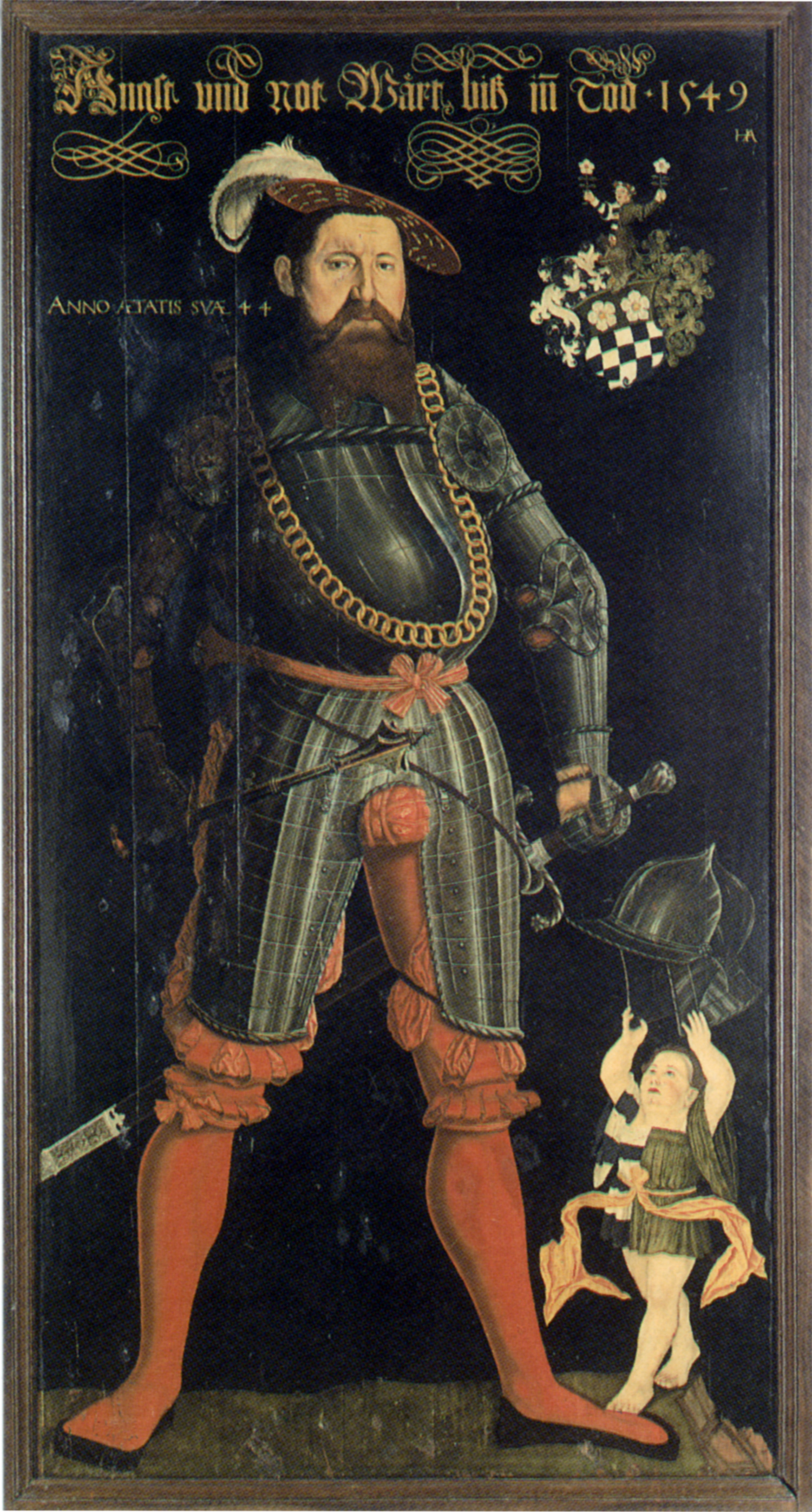
Portrait of Frölich at age 44, by Hans Asper (1549)

Wilhelm Frölich (c. 1504 – 4 December 1562) was a Swiss mercenary commander who served the French Crown during the Italian Wars. He has been described as one of the most successful mercenary leaders in Swiss history.

== Life ==
Frölich was born in 1504 or 1505 in the town of Riesbach (now a district of Zürich), in the canton of Zürich, into a family of humble background. He entered French service in 1522 and was promoted to captain in 1536. Frölich won fame as commander of the Swiss mercenaries at the Battle of Ceresole in 1544. That same year, he acquired the bourgeoisie of Solothurn, after he was stripped of his rights as a bourgeois of Zürich due to his mercenary activity. He became a member of Solothurn's Grand Council in 1550 and of its Small Council in 1555.

As a colonel, Frölich served in Italy from 1551 to 1557 and in Picardy in 1558, during King Henry II's Italian War, and campaigned against the Huguenots in 1562 during the First French War of Religion. He was made a lieutenant of the elite Cent-Suisses. Frölich was ennobled by Henry II in 1556 and was created a Papal knight in 1557. He died in Paris on 4 December 1562 and was buried at the Corderliers Church.

Frölich married Anna Rahn, the daughter of an influential Zürich family, in 1545. Their two sons, who went on to become captains in French service, were killed at the Battle of Die (1575) during the Fifth War of Religion. A funerary bust of Frölich by Pierre Bontemps is now at the Louvre Museum.

== Bibliography ==
- Oman, Charles. A History of the Art of War in the Sixteenth Century. London: Methuen & Co., 1937.
