= Rodolfo Baglioni =

Italian condottiero

Rodolfo (or Ridolfo) Baglioni (June 1512 – March 1554) was an Italian condottiero serving in the Imperial army during the Italian War of 1542. He was the son of Malatesta II Baglioni, from whom he inherited the lordship of Perugia, Bettona, Spello and other lands in Umbria.

At the Battle of Ceresole, he commanded the Florentine light cavalry. He was killed in action while fighting in Val di Chiana, in March 1554.

== Bibliography ==
- Page at condottieridiventura.it (in Italian)
- Oman, Charles (1937). A History of the Art of War in the Sixteenth Century. London: Methuen & Co.
