= Ferdinando Sanseverino, Prince of Salerno =

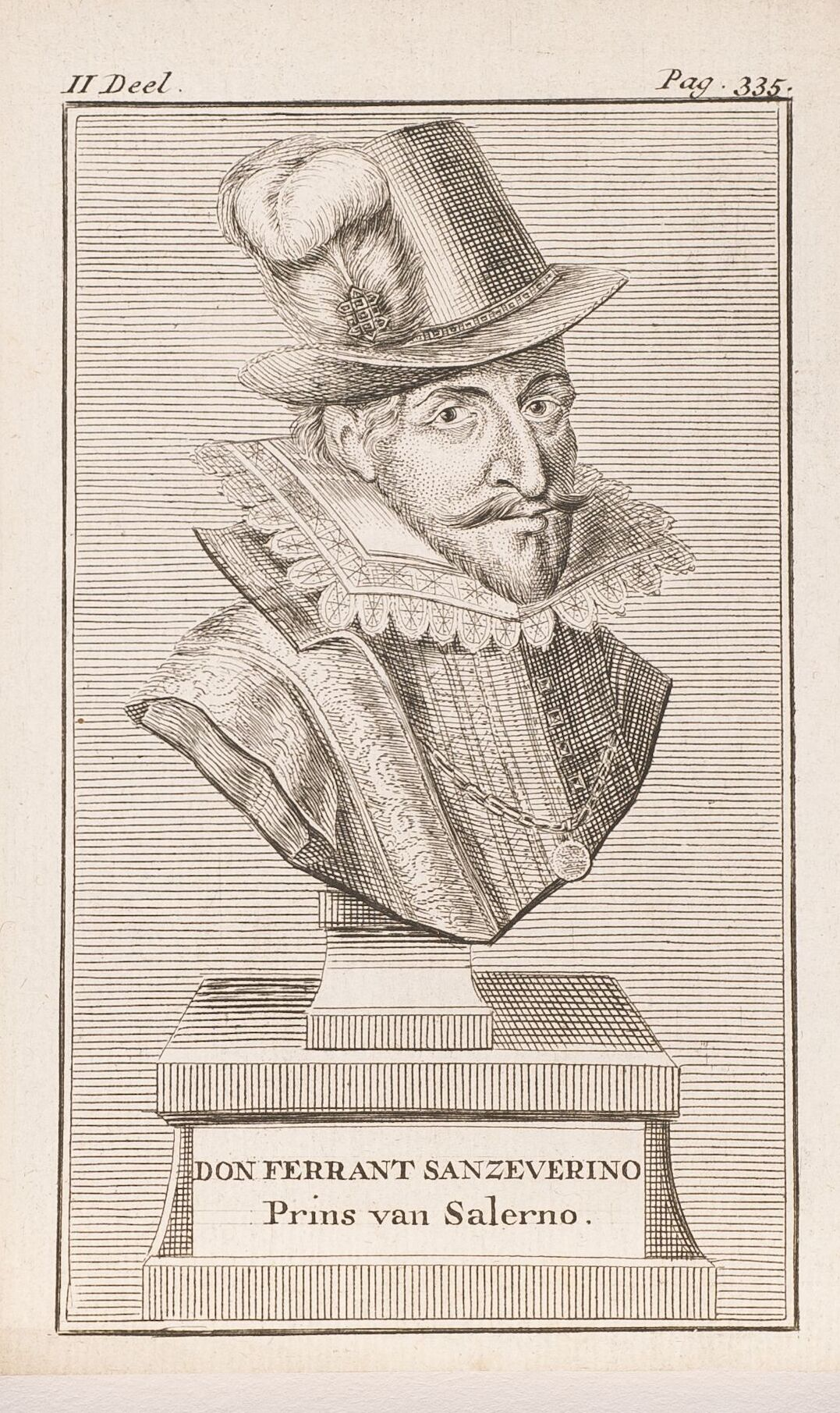
Ferdinando Sanseverino

Ferdinando (Ferrante) Sanseverino, Prince of Salerno (18 January 1507 – 1568) was an Italian condottiero with "Renaissance prince" ideals.

== Biography ==
Born in Naples, he was the son of Roberto II Sanseverino ( es ) and a noblewoman from a Salerno family. Fernando Sanseverino was the fourth and last of the Sanseverino Princes of Salerno.

He fought for Emperor Charles V in Germany and France. He took part to Charles' coronation in Bologna (1530), and was also present at the Conquest of Tunis (1535).

He was one of the imperial leaders in the fourth war against Francis I of France and fought at the battle of Ceresole (1544). Returning to Naples, he clashed with the Spanish viceroy Pedro de Toledo, due to his opposition to the institution of Holy Inquisition tribunals in the Kingdom of Naples. He therefore moved to France at the court of King Henry II, embracing the Huguenot faith. His Italian fiefs were given to the Gonzaga family.

Ferdinando Sanseverino died at Avignon, in France, in 1568.

== Main accomplishments ==
....Ferrante Sanseverino was not only an excellent soldier; he was also and above all an important patron of the arts. As "Prince of Salerno" he had the castle of Arechi as his residence, where he surrounded himself with nobles such as the Mazzacane, the Capano, the Dentice, the Carrano, the Britonio and many others, as well as artists, writers and intellectuals such as Agostino Nifo, Scipione Capece and Bernardo Tasso, the father of the better known Torquato Tasso (who started -when teenager- with him his literary works). His wealth also allowed him to revive and restore nobility to the prestigious School of Medicine of Salerno, appointing its Prior the famous doctor Paolo Grisignano, author of the "Comment on the Aphorisms of Hippocrates" and inviting numerous and illustrious scholars to come and teach. During his principality, Salerno returned for a few decades to appear among the main cities of the South Italy, resurrecting, albeit partially, the ancient glories of the Lombard and Norman princes. His generosity, his patronage and reports of his military exploits made him an extremely popular man throughout the Kingdom. Angelo Guzzo

He was a passionate supporter of contemporary theatre, and had one built within his palace in Naples.

His refusal to accept the Inquisition inside his possession in Salerno created a break between him and the Spanish government in southern Italy. Mainly as a consequence of this, Fernando Sanseverino was forced to exile in France.

There, he organized a naval attack of French ships against Naples and Salerno, but it failed because the allied Turkish fleet didn't show up.

His legacy in the Principality of Salerno was to bring to the southern Italian city (and the surrounding area) the ideas of the Italian Renaissance. His private secretary was Bernardo Tasso, the father of Torquato Tasso, so Torquato was born in the principality in 1544 and lived there until 1554, when his father took him to Rome.

== See also ==
- Salerno
- Principality of Salerno
