= Pirro Colonna =

Italian military leader

Pirro Colonna (1500 – November 1552) was an Italian military leader in the service of Charles V during the Italian War of 1542. He commanded the garrison of Carignano during the French sieges of the city before and after the Battle of Ceresole.
