= Carlo Gonzaga (condottiero) =

Italian military leader

Carlo Gonzaga (1525–1566) was an Italian military leader. At the Battle of Ceresole, he commanded the Imperial heavy cavalry, and was captured by the French when it fled from the field.
