= Estouteville =

== Names ==
- The Estouteville family is a former family of Norman nobility.
- Duke of Estouteville, title of a branch of the Royal House of Valois, heir of the Estouteville family

== Places ==
- Estouteville, former municipality of Seine-Maritime, now part of Estouteville-Écalles
- Estouteville (Esmont, Virginia), a historic house
- Estouteville-Écalles, municipality of Seine-Maritime
