= François de Bourbon, Count of Saint-Pol =

French prince and governor (1491-1544/5)

François de Bourbon
- Comte de Saint-Pol; Duc d'Estouteville
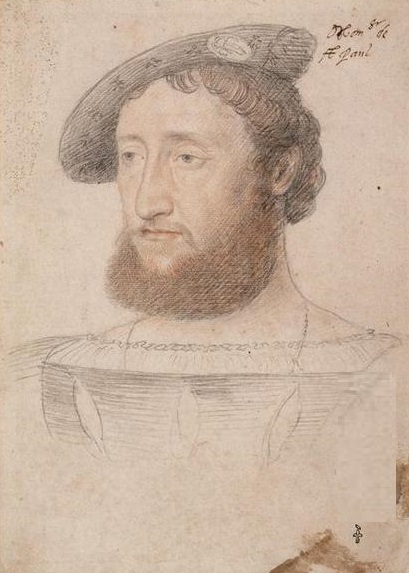
- Born: 6 October 1491; Ham, France
- Died: 1 September 1544/1545
- Spouse: Adrienne d'Estouteville
- Issue: François de Bourbon; Marie de Bourbon
- House: Bourbon-Vendôme
- Father: François de Bourbon, Count of Vendôme
- Mother: Marie de Luxembourg

François de Bourbon, comte de Saint-Pol (6 October 1491 – 1 September 1544/1545) was a French governor, soldier, royal favourite and Prince du sang (prince of the royal blood). The son of François de Bourbon and Marie de Luxembourg, François was the heir to the comté de Saint-Pol from his mother. At the advent of the reign of the king François I, Saint-Pol participated in the successful Italian campaign which culminated at the decisive battle of Marignano. In 1519 he became governor of the Île de France in lieu of his elder brother (the duc de Vendôme). Saint-Pol had an important role to play in the French campaign of 1521 against the Holy Roman Empire, aiding in the defence of Mézières by seeing the city resupplied. After the failure of the Imperial siege he followed the royal army as it chased their adversaries back towards Valenciennes. He would again play an important role in the campaign of the following year, garrisoning first Doullens and then Corbie against the Anglo-Imperial army. In the Italian campaign of 1523 to 1524, Saint-Pol would take charge of the French army to lead its retreat from the peninsula after the seigneur de Bonnivet was wounded. With the return of the French army into Italy in 1525, Saint-Pol participated in the disastrous battle of Pavia and was made an Imperial captive, though he soon escaped from his imprisonment.

After king François returned from captivity, Saint-Pol participated in many of the acts by which he reasserted his authority over the kingdoms parlements and in negotiations with the English. As part of a new French war against the Holy Roman Empire, Saint-Pol received the honour of leading a French army into Italy. After some initial successes, his army was destroyed by the Imperial commander de Leyva at Landriano and Saint-Pol became a prisoner for a second time. Released as a term of the 1529 peace of Cambrai, he returned to the centre of French affairs, alongside the king for the return of his children, the marriage of his second son and the royal response to the affair of the Placards. With the renewal of war against the Holy Roman Empire in 1536, Saint-Pol conquered Bresse and Bugey for France before retiring from the army back to the court.

By 1540, Saint-Pol was one of the handful of chief favourites of the king, though not a paramount one. He supported the seigneur de Chabot in his struggles after the latter's disgrace and imprisonment. He played a role in Chabot's rehabilitation and was rewarded for his loyalty. With the renewal of war against the Empire in 1542, Saint-Pol played a role in the eastern campaign into Luxembourg, and in the defence of Landrecies against the siege of the Emperor. With the death of Chabot, he briefly served as lieutenant-général de Normandie, though he would be replaced in December 1543 by the seigneur d'Annebault who inherited Chabot's primacy in royal favour. In 1544 he counselled against allowing the French army in Italy to engage the enemy, but was overruled by the king. He died in September of either 1544 or 1545.

== Early life and family ==
=== Birth and parents ===
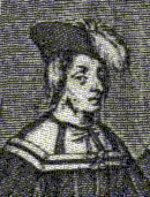
François de Bourbon, father of the comte de Saint-Pol

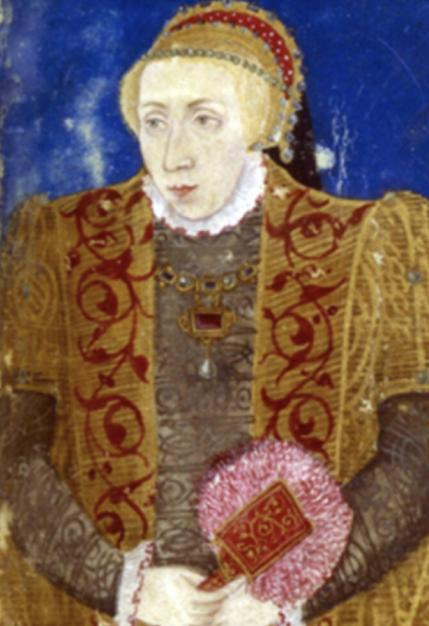
Marie de Luxembourg (possible portrait), mother of the comte de Saint-Pol

François de Bourbon was born in Ham on 6 October 1491 the son of François de Bourbon, comte de Vendôme (count of Vendôme) and Marie de Luxembourg the dame de Saint-Pol. François' father had fought in the Italian Wars of Charles VIII and was killed during this conflict in 1495, leaving Marie to raise their children and manage their property (something she would do until her death in 1546).

The house of Bourbon-Vendôme, of which François was a member through his father, descended agnatically (through the male line) from the sixth son of king Louis IX of France, Robert, the comte de Clermont. This made François a prince du sang (prince of the royal blood)

In 1475, the Luxembourg families' fortunes (of which François' mother Marie was a member) had received a heavy blow by the execution of the comte de Saint-Pol. By the 1480s, the dispossessed Marie de Luxembourg was the theoretical heir to the inheritance that had been confiscated from her family. Charles VIII restored her to much of the Luxembourg inheritance for the occasion of her marriage to François' father, the comte de Vendôme. By this means, Marie became the comtesse de Saint-Pol, de Marle, de Soissons; vicomtesse de Meaux; dame d'Enghien, Dunkerque, Gravelines, Ham, La Roche, Bohain, Beaurevoir and Châtelain (castellan) of Lille. Through the marriage the Luxembourg family was tied to the junior royal branch of the Bourbon-Vendôme.

François was heir to parts of his mothers' extensive property, which straddled the border of France and the Holy Roman Empire. In particular he received from her the comté (county) de Saint-Pol in Artois which was of vital strategic importance, as well as the richest territory in the province.

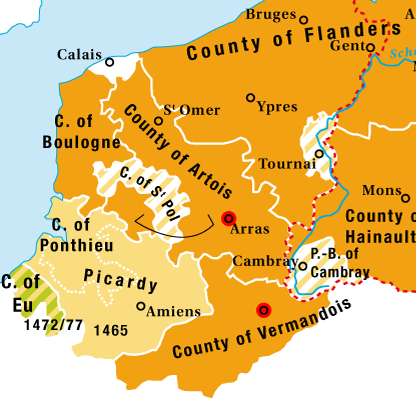
Comté de Saint-Pol in the Fifteenth-Century

The comté de Saint-Pol had been one of the chief holdings of a branch of the Luxembourg family. In the contract of François' parents' marriage it had been stipulated that the territory would fall in perpetuity to their second son, i.e. François. The territory was confiscated by the Imperial (i.e. Holy Roman) side at the start of every war with France, but the neutrality of the territory was respected by the French king until 1537.

=== Siblings and nephews ===
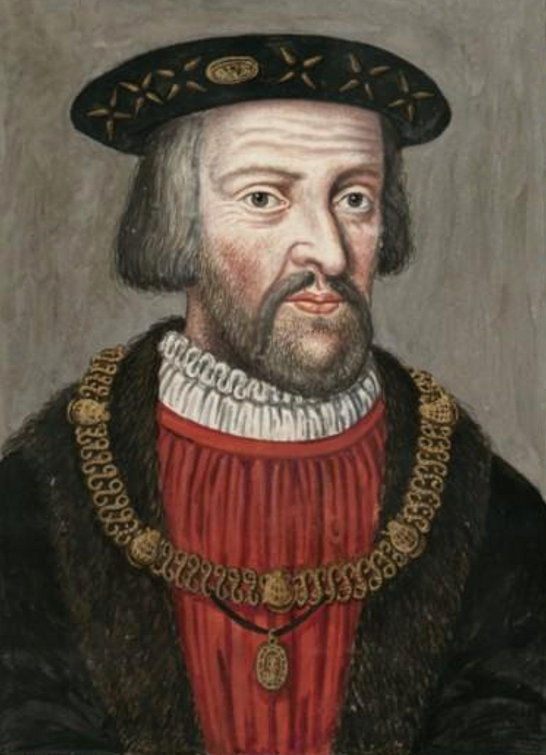
Saint-Pol's elder brother, Charles de Bourbon, comte then duc de Vendôme

François had an elder brother, Charles (1489–1537) who would succeed to the title of Vendôme upon the death of their father in 1495, and marry Françoise d'Alençon; and a younger brother Louis (1493–1553) who would be elevated to the cardinalate. Through his elder brother Charles, François would be the great-uncle of king Henri IV, who ascended to the throne after the extinction of the Valois male line in 1589. François' eldest sister, Antoinette entered the House of Lorraine when she married the comte de Guise in 1513, while the younger sister became the abbess of Fontevraud.

Two of François' nephews through his elder brother Charles (François, the comte d'Enghien and Jean, the comte de Soissons) would live with him during their youth. This was a common practice for young nobles, something that the historian Neuschel describes as a 'period of apprenticeship'. One of them would go on to marry François' daughter (and their first cousin).

François would take the step to challenge the French king François I over the plans for the marriage of his daughter Madeleine to the Scottish king James V. Instead, he favoured a match for the Scottish king with his niece (a daughter of his elder brother Vendôme). He was joined in opposition to the party that favoured the marriage (the baron de Montmorency, the king's sister Marguerite) by the cardinal de Lorraine, though the latter had a different idea as to who James should marry instead.

=== Marriage and children ===
François married Adrienne d'Estouteville, the daughter of Jacqueline d'Estouteville and the two would have issue:

- François de Bourbon, duc d'Estouteville.
- Marie de Bourbon, married first Jean de Bourbon, comte de Soissons, and then François de Clèves duc de Nevers.

By his marriage, François became the duc d'Estouteville (duke of Estouteville), and the most powerful seigneur (lord) in haute Normandie. This strong influence in the region meant that he became an important figure even without holding office in the wider province. Thus, on 25 November 1536, his mother-in-law wrote to the seigneur de Matignon requesting that a particular Norman noble be punished for their excesses and that her son-in-law was involving himself in this process.

=== Physical appearance ===
The historian Nawrocki notes that while physical attractiveness was important for many courtiers in king François' court, it was not a requirement for François (who was reputedly 'ugly'), as a prince du sang he enjoyed a position at the court by right.

=== Patronage and associates ===
Henceforth, François is referred to through this article by the title by which he is best known, the comte de Saint-Pol. The Bourbon-Vendôme family at large, served as patrons to the more obscure du Bellay family, helping them break through into prominence. The cardinal Jean du Bellay, who also produced poems, would dedicate several of his Juvenilia (works of his youth) to the family.

Saint-Pol was one of the closest confidants of the duc de Bourbon, who was also his cousin.

Through the lands he possessed in the Pays de Caux in haute Normandie, he became a neighbour of the Annebault family. He would serve as one of the patrons for Claude d'Annebault, who would go on to serve as amiral de France (admiral of France) and a royal favourite.

The sculptor Benvenuto Cellini, recounts in his memoires a dark joke of Saint-Pol's in 1544. François had become concerned that Cellini might leave France to return to his native Italy. Cellini alleges that Saint-Pol jokingly reassured the king that he would ensure Cellini remained in France, by hanging him. This caused the king's mistress, the duchesse d'Étampes (duchess of Étampes) to fall into laughter, opining that the sculptor deserved it. She was followed by the king, who noted he had no objection to the idea, so long as Saint-Pol could find an equally talented replacement for the artist.

=== Incomes and finances ===
During the 1520s, Saint-Pol would enjoy a royal pension of 10,000 livres (pounds, one of the French coinages) and during the 1530s this would be increased first to 12,000 and then to 20,000 by 1536.

The Italian explorer Giovanni da Verrazzano would name several geographic features for the family in his explorations of the North American coast. The largest river he encountered he named Vendôme in honour of Saint-Pol's elder brother. Saint-Pol himself saw a hill by the sea named for him. Other nobles who Verrazzano named geographical features after would include the duc d'Alençon and the cardinal de Lorraine.

Saint-Pol was one of the many high-profile debtors to the surintendant des finances (superintendent of the finances) the baron de Semblançay. Other prominent men Semblançay was a creditor for include the king of Navarre and the marchese di Saluzzo (marquis of Saluzzo). Saint-Pol would also rack up around 4,700 livres in debt to a certain Lambert Meigrit between 1519 and 1526.

At some point in the late-1530s, the paymaster of Saint-Pol's compagnie, a certain Claude Grandin, was compelled to send a clerk to Lyon to track down his predecessor in the position, a certain Hector Personne, so that the latter figure might provide money the compagnie was owed. The trouble would be resolved by August 1539, after a considerable wait.

=== Honours ===
Saint-Pol would receive elevation as a chevalier (knight) of the Ordre de Saint-Michel (Order of Saint-Michel, highest order of French chivalry founded by Louis XI). As a chevalier of this ordre, he would participate in a tribunal condemning a man to the gallows for critiquing the conduct of the war.

=== Compagnie d'ordonnance ===
Alongside his elder brother Vendôme, Saint-Pol was the captain of a compagnie d'ordonnance (the aristocratic heavy cavalry that formed the core of the French army). Other great nobles who held this honour in this period were the maréchaux (marshals - leaders of the French military) de Lautrec, of Aubigny and de Fleuranges. In addition to these pre-eminent military figures was a prince of Lorraine and the duc de Guise. The Norman noble Annebault would serve as lieutenant of Saint-Pol's compagnie, he would later become amiral de France, and had seen his first celebrated service during the 1521 siege of Mézières. Nawrocki places the beginning of Annebault's lieutenancy to Saint-Pol either in 1523 or slightly before, and notes that he served with Saint-Pol during the disastrous campaign of 1524. Annebault was still serving as lieutenant for Saint-Pol's compagnie during the 1525 Pavia campaign. He ceased to be Saint-Pol's lieutenant in 1525, entering the services of the comte de Maulévrier's compagnie. With Maulévrier's death in 1531, Annebault would come to command his own compagnie d'ordonnance. The seigneur de Thais would serve as lieutenant for Saint-Pol's compagnie from 1538 to 1541 before becoming colonel-général (colonel general) of the French infantry. The Dauphinois noble, Guy de Maugiron would also serve as lieutenant in Saint-Pol's compagnie. He would go on to serve as lieutenant-général of Dauphiné (lieutenant-general - second in military command behind the governor) after the death of Saint-Pol.

== Reign of Louis XII ==
During the winter of 1514, Louis XII's life faded away. On 1 January 1515, he died at the Hôtel des Tournelles. On his death bed he was surrounded by many princes du sang and favourites, including Saint-Pol, his brother the comte de Vendôme (count of Vendôme), the duc de Bourbon (duke of Bourbon), and the vicomte de Thouars (viscount of Thouars). In his final days, the king had been visited on occasion by the comte d'Angoulême, his cousin and heir. The day after his death, 2 January, Angoulême announced Louis' death and declared himself to be king as 'François'.

== Reign of François I ==
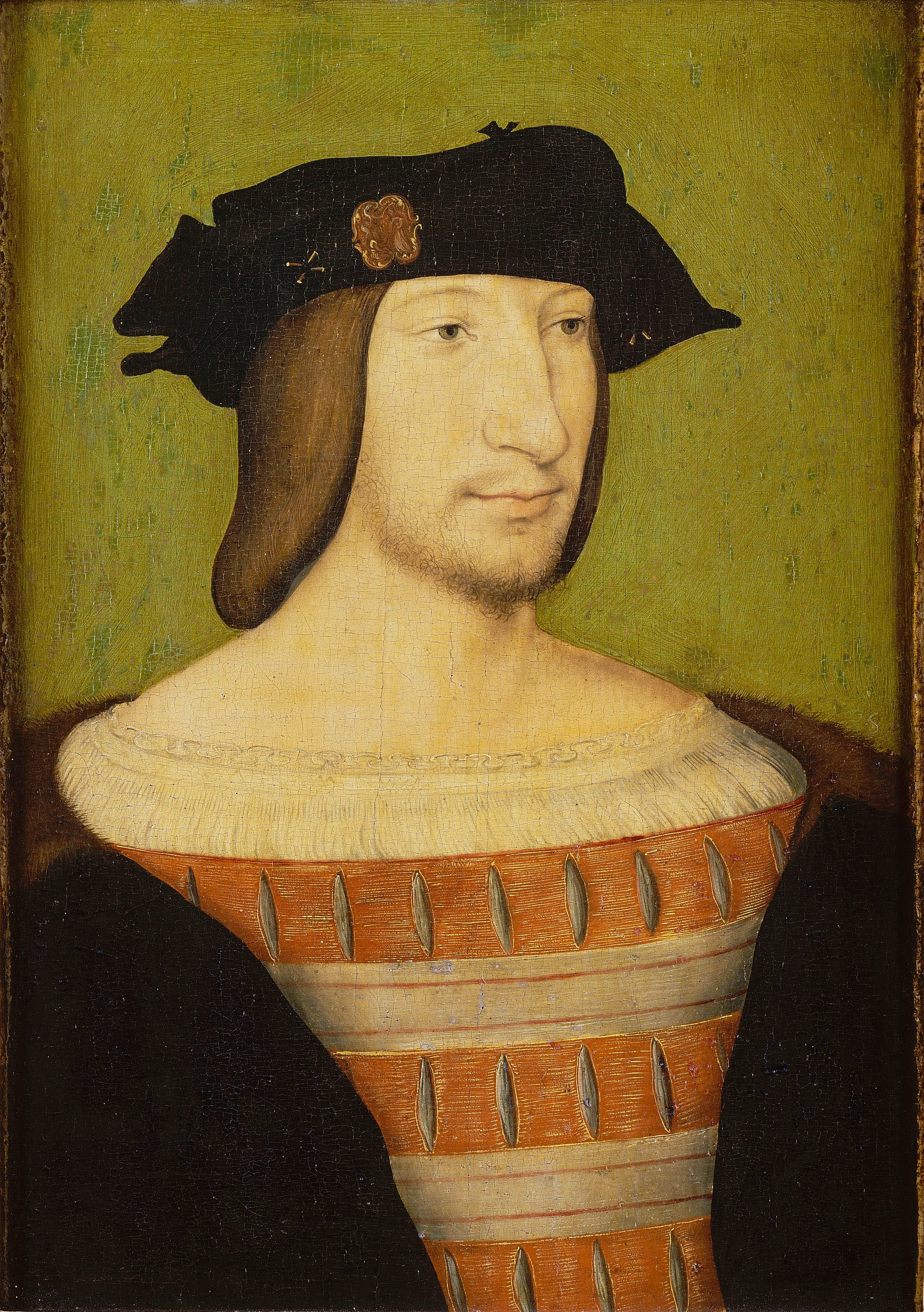
King of France François I at the beginning of his reign in 1515

In January 1515, six days after Louis XII had been buried at the Basilica of Saint-Denis, the new king, François, made for Reims for his coronation. The procession that accompanied him to Reims was an immense one, including many great nobles such as: premier prince du sang (first prince of the royal blood - closest agnatic relation to the king's family and François' heir in the absence of a son) the duc d'Alençon; the duc de Bourbon (who also held the position of connétable or 'Constable of France' the most senior military command in the kingdom); the princes of Bourbon-Vendôme (the comte de Vendôme and Saint-Pol); the comte de Guise of the House of Lorraine; the comte de Nevers of the House of La Marck; the chevaliers de l'Ordre de Saint-Michel (knights of the Order of Saint-Michel - a chivalric order established by Louis XI) and the various captains and governors of the provinces of the kingdom.

This procession arrived before Reims on 24 January and the new king made his Joyous Entry into the city. The entry concluded in front of Reims Cathedral, where the archbishop of Reims and many of the kingdoms other prelates waited for him. The princes du sang and clergy entered the cathedral with François who fell to his knees and thanked god and the virgin Mary for what they had granted him. The days festivities concluded with a feast. Around midnight, the king conducted his Matins, early to account for the ceremony of the coming day. Only those princes proximate in blood to him (i.e. the princes du sang) were with him for this private occasion.

In the morning he took his seat in the cathedral alongside the archbishop of Reims, with the Twelve Peers. These were the six pairs ecclésiastiques (ecclesiastic peers), divided into the ducal-bishops and the comital bishops, firstly the ducal-bishops: the archbishop of Reims, the bishop of Laon (Saint-Pol's brother the cardinal de Bourbon), and the bishop of Langres; then the comital-bishops: the bishop of Châlons, the bishop of Noyon and the bishop of Beauvais. Alongside these were the six pairs laïcs (secular peers ), however many of these territories had become part of the royal domain, and thus the pairs were represented by various stand in nobles. There was the duc de Bourgogne (represented by the duc d'Alençon), the duc de Normandie (represented by the duc de Lorraine), the duc de Guyenne (represented by the duc de Châtellerault), the comte de Champagne (represented by the comte de Saint-Pol), the comte de Toulouse (represented by the prince de La Roche-sur-Yon and finally the comte de Flandre who was still an independent seigneur, however the comté was held by the future Holy Roman Emperor Charles V, who apologised for his absence, leaving Saint-Pol's other brother the comte de Vendôme to assume his role in the ceremony.

The abbot of Saint-Remi brought the Holy Ampulla to the cathedral, where it was given to the archbishop of Reims. Meanwhile, the abbot of Saint-Denis had brought the clothes of coronation, which he had laid on the altar. Several hours of service followed with hymns and prayers. François was then invited to take the oaths of his coronation, by which he promised to protect Christians, expunge heresy, show mercy and allow for internal peace within Christendom. He was then given the insignias of knighthood, his cloak stripped, and breeches provided by his grand chambellan the duc de Longueville. It was the role of Bourgogne in the ceremony to provide the spurs, so Alençon provided them to the king. They were attached, then immediately removed as the ceremony dictated. The archbishop of Reims then presented him his sword, lowering the gird around him before removing it in turn. He then kissed the sword and handed it to François, who raised it up to god, before passing it off to the duc de Bourbon who knighted him. François was then anointed with the Chrism. The king was then dressed by his grand chambellan. François was now invested with the paraphernalia of kingship@ the ring, the crown, the sceptre. The pairs who were with the king then held the crown above his head. Te Deums and high mass followed. With the pairs de France, François advanced to the great altar, and received several ritual gifts. Having received absolution from the archbishop, François left the cathedral with the princes du sang, ecclesiastical pairs and other seigneurs heading out before him. He was then hailed by the crowd outside.

=== Royal council ===
In the analysis of the historians Michon and Rentet into the composition of the royal council, Saint-Pol occupied a secondary position in the body during 1525, 1527, 1530, 1538 and 1543 with a primary position on the council (alongside the cardinal de Tournon, the amiral de Chabot and maréchal d'Annebault during 1542.

Those François surrounded himself with at the start of his reign were a fairly geographically limited group, focused around his old lands of Angoulême, however by the late-1520s his council would be composed a much broader geographic range. For example, this included for Picardie, Saint-Pol and his brother Vendôme; for Béarn the king of Navarre and the archbishop of Bordeaux; and for Lorraine the cardinal de Lorraine. By the wide range of geographic representation, the crown was able to ensure it had mediating figures with the various peripheries of the realm.

Michon notes that while nobles d'épée (nobles of the sword, of whom Saint-Pol counted among) dominated François' councils, sword nobles who were princes, like Saint-Pol constituted a minority. Of the thirty three nobles d'épée in the council, there were only eight who could be described as princes or 'great seigneurs'.

As a prince, Saint-Pol was a 'born adviser' to the king as concerned his royal councils. Thus, the king called to council the duc d'Alençon, the king of Navarre, the duc de Bourbon and the three Vendôme brothers. Among these 'born advisors', it was only Saint-Pol who carried any significant political weight. Michon argues that even during the crisis of Pavia in 1525, Saint-Pol's brother Vendôme did not impose himself on the council.

Unlike many of the kings chief conseillers, Saint-Pol would never occupy a place in the royal household (be it grand maître, gentilhomme de la chambre, grand écuyer etc.). His proximity to the king therefore derived from their close acquaintance. In one episode, recorded by the memoirist Brantôme, Saint-Pol presumed to address the king as 'Monsieur', as his elder brother Vendôme was permitted to do. Despite being among the king's favourites (unlike his elder brother), François took Saint-Pol to task, explaining that the privilege of addressing him that way was something which could be granted to Vendôme, but not to him.

=== Marignano campaign ===
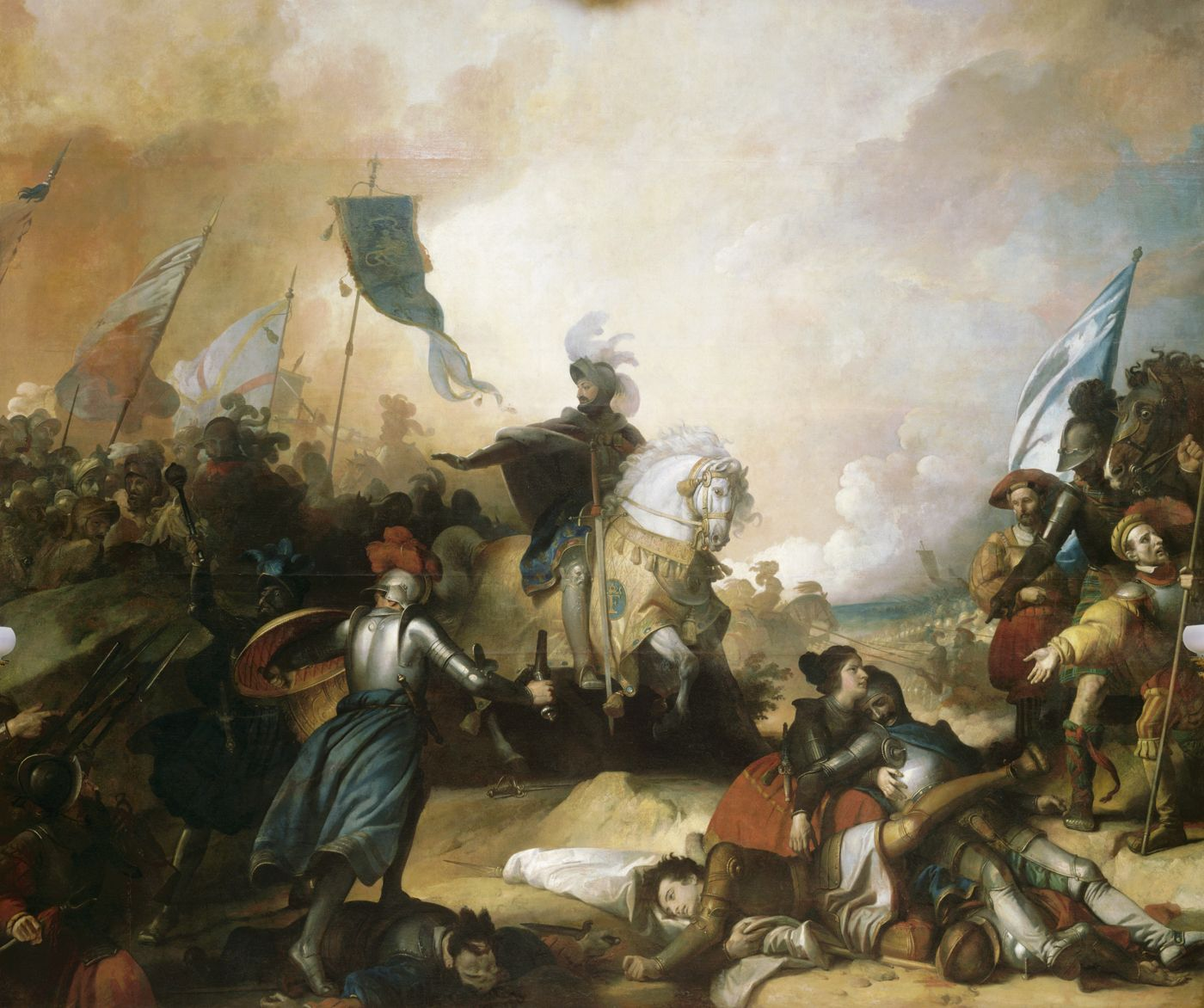
Battle of Marignano, the 'battle of giants' at which Saint-Pol commended himself

On 26 June 1515, François let it be known that he intended to head to Italy for campaign. In his absence his mother Louise would serve as regent. By the end of July he was with his army in Grenoble. Aware of the coming invasion, the duca di Milano (duke of Milan, king of Aragón, Pope and Holy Roman Emperor formed a defensive league. Despite this grand league, the duca di Milano would primarily have to rely on the support of the Swiss to combat the French, as he had in 1513. François' army crossed the Alps at an unexpected location. The condotierri captain Prospero Colonna, who had been sent north to support the Swiss, was caught off guard and captured by several groups of French hommes d'armes (men-at-arms). The French army descended into the plains of Piedmont, with only a brief pause in Turin. Outflanked by the French, the Swiss retreated to lake Maggiore. There was little success to be found in the French negotiations with the Swiss at this time.

On 31 August, François crossed the Ticino river. By now a delegation had arrived from Milan, offering their capitulation to him, however the city was divided between those determined to resist, and those willing to acquiesce to French rule. Further negotiations with the Swiss yielded a treaty by which they would withdraw from the Milanese territories they occupied in return for 1,000,000 écus (crowns) of which 150,000 would require immediate payment. The duca di Milano would be compensated for his dispossession from his ducato (duchy) with the duché de Nemours (duchy of Nemours) and several other concessions. François agreed to these terms, and quickly sent the up front demanded money across. However, while it was acceptable to some of the Swiss cantons, with their soldiers resolving to return home, other cantons rejected the deal. The king established himself at Marignano on 10 September. The Swiss came forth from Milan to offer battle.

The resulting decisive battle of Marignano, at which Saint-Pol fought was described by the French maréchal Trivulzio as a 'battle of giants'. The casualties were estimated as being of great number, including many leading French nobles (among whom the duc de Châtellerault and a son of the vicomte de Thouars). On 16 September, as a result of the battle Milan capitulated, to be followed by the citadel of the city on 4 October. The king entered his new territory in triumph on 11 October. In a letter François wrote after the battle, Saint-Pol came in for particular praise for his valour, alongside the connétable de Bourbon and a third figure. After François' triumphal entry into Milan, tournaments were held in celebration. At one of these tournaments, Saint-Pol was wounded by a lance wielded by the seigneur de Brion (the future amiral de Chabot).

Upon the ascent of François to the French throne, he had not had a male heir. On 28 February 1518, his wife, the queen Claude gave birth to a son. The baptism of this son was a day of great satisfaction for Claude, as well as for François' mother Louise. The château d'Amboise was to play host to the occasion. The attendee list was a glittering one: the duc de Bourbon and the duc d'Alençon led the procession to the church. The instruments of the baptism were held by the duc de Vendôme, the comte de Saint-Pol and the prince de La Roche-sur-Yon. Also to be found present for the occasion were foreign princes such as the comte de Guise, duke of Albany and the prince d'Orange. The ceremony was presided over by the cardinal de Boisy. A spectacular ballet and banquet followed, then jousts, tournaments and a mock battle assault on a fort.

On 16 December 1519, the comte de Saint-Pol assumed the charge of governor of the Île-de-France. He would also serve as the governor of Paris. By this appointment he replaced in the charge his elder brother the duc de Vendôme. Vendôme was moved to the governorship of Picardie, over which the Bourbon family would hold a quasi-hereditary grip. In Saint-Pol's absence from the government in the coming years, the archbishop of Aix would hold the responsibility in his stead.

Not long after surrendering the government of the Île-de-France to his brother, the duc de Vendôme attempted to impose a garrison of fifty lances on Beauvais. This aroused protest from the notables of the city, who were part of the territory of the Île-de-France, who came to Saint-Pol to protest. Their governor responded that there was nothing that he could do immediately, but that the king would make Vendôme understand Beauvais was under his jurisdiction and have the garrison removed.

According to the historian Cloulas, in a joking mood, the king led an attack on Saint-Pol's hôtel (an urban mansion) at Romorantin after accusing him in jest on Epiphany 1521 (6 January) of proclaiming himself the roi de la fève (king of the bean - a tradition by which the person who finds the bean in their portion of the Galette des Rois is king for the day). During the mock battle, according to Knecht at the moment François was attempting to breach the main door of Saint-Pol's residence, one of those defending Saint-Pol's hôtel threw out a burning ember from a window which struck François on the head causing him serious injury. It took the king two months to convalesce, and he inspired a new fashion at the court by the hair and beard he grew to hide the scar.

Michon, citing the ambassadors from Italy's reports, recounts the story slightly differently. In his telling it was rather the sénéchal de Normandie who was named king of the bean, and he took François into his team. This band went to confront one led by the comte de Saint-Pol, and the two sides fought with fruit and eggs. Then an overzealous servant threw a flaming log from a window onto the king's head, causing him to collapse, and require his head shaved to be treated. He then had all the other men of the court shave their heads so he would not be alone in this.

During the campaign of 1521, the comte de Saint-Pol fought alongside the vicomte de Thouars.

=== Northern campaign of 1521 ===
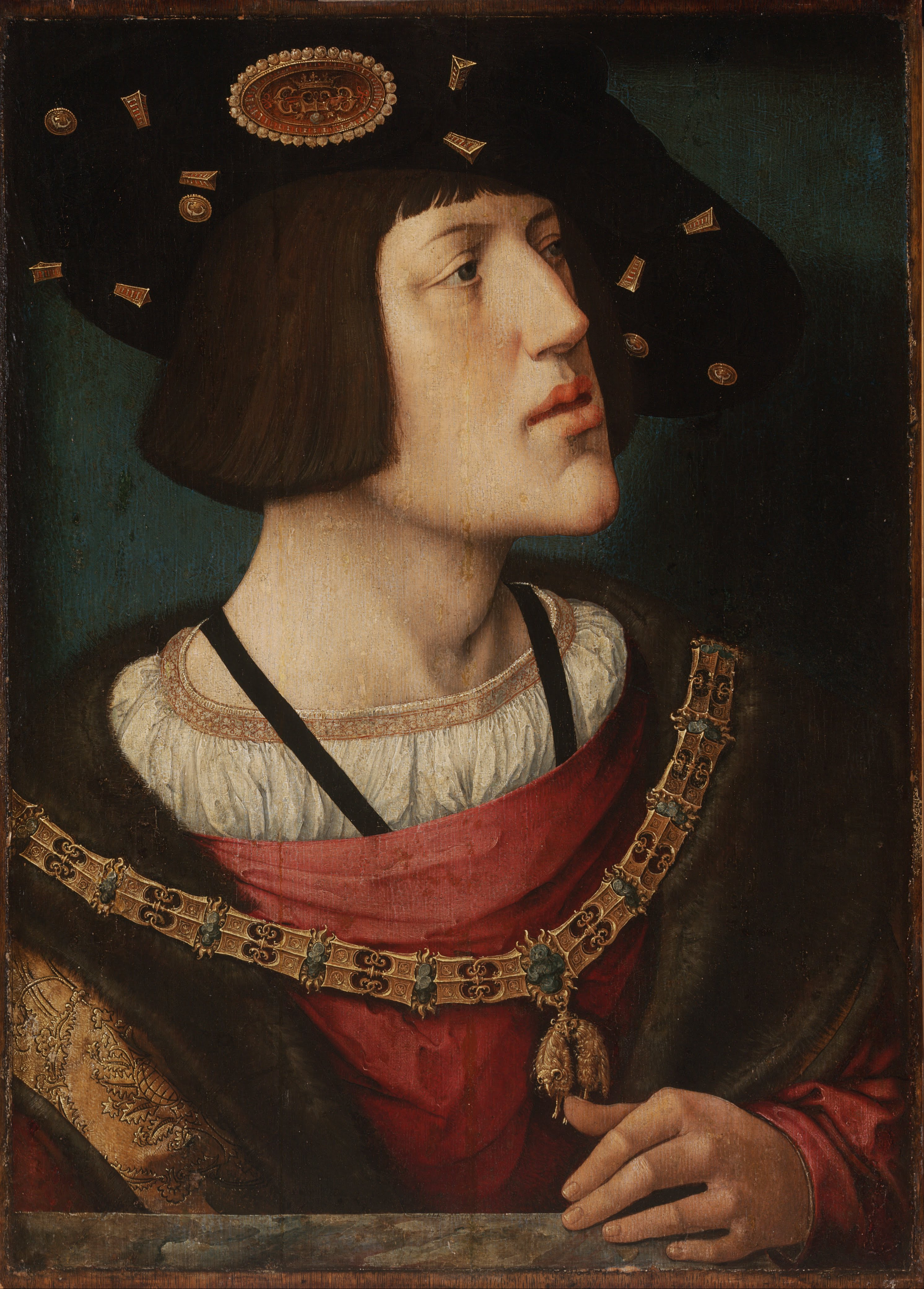
Charles V, Holy Roman Emperor in 1519, persistent adversary of the French king

Around Mid-August, the amiral de Bonnivet (admiral of Bonnivet), who was leading the Navarrese campaign in the south of the kingdom for the crown attempted to intercede through his wife Louise de Crèvecœur to have the compagnie of a certain Théligny replaced with that of Saint-Pol's.

Relevant towns in Picardie for the Franco-Imperial war in 1521, blue marked locations were subject to an Imperial siege or sack, orange marked locations were subject to a French siege or sack
Relevant towns in Champagne for the Franco-Imperial war in 1521, blue marked locations were subject to an Imperial siege or sack

The summer of 1521 had proved to be disastrous militarily for François I. Now, an Imperial army threatened the city of Mézières, the capture of which would not only open the door to parts of the province of Picardie to the Holy Roman Emperor but would also damage François' prestige. He therefore took it as a top priority that the city be maintained. Come the end of August, the defence of the city was bolstered with companies numbering 2,000 men under the chevalier Bayard, the baron de Montmorency (who would over the course of François reign progress from maréchal [1521] to grand maître [1526] to connétable [1538]) and the seigneur d'Annebault.

The Imperial army, under the command of the graaf van Nassau (count of Nassau) invested Mézières. The city had only one gate on the mainland and this was where Nassau made his camp, while the reichsritter (Imperial knight) von Sickingen established himself opposite. Their artillery set to work on the walls. The city resisted well, though food quickly began to run low. As September arrived the situation continued to deteriorate within the city, leading to François (who was basing himself out of Reims) to order its resupply. It would be Saint-Pol who led the resupply convoy, arriving on 23 September with the support of the Swiss under the vicomte de Thouars and the seigneur de Sedan. Things were little better in the camp of the besiegers than in the city, and with Saint-Pol having resupplied the city, the word was given to withdraw from the siege on 25 September, the siege ending two days after.

François, at the head of an army of 30,000, now set off in pursuit of the retreating Nassau. Nassau was making for the town of Guise with the intention of putting this place to siege instead. Saint-Pol's brother, the comte de Vendôme was sent to capture Vervins to interfere with the graaf's line of retreat. Saint-Pol meanwhile had recaptured Mouzon on 3 October. Nassau now resolved to change his course, first putting the town and people of Aubenton to the sword, and then marching for Estrées.

Despite these reverses, the Emperor continued to assert that the entire kingdom of France was his by right of a Papal decision from 1303. He would not discuss peace or a truce with François due to the latter's refusal to provide to him his territories of Bourgogne, Provence, Dauphiné, Montpellier, Roussillon, Milan and Asti. His English ally the cardinal of Wolsey was feeling less bullish about the alliances prospects and looked to attain a truce of eighteen to twenty months with the French king prior to the end of November. François delivered his response from his camp at Origny on 12 October. He would agree to a truce, if it was for four or five years, and it included as parties, the Emperor, the Pope, Florence, Mantua, and the Italian rebels. While the truce was in effect, he further demanded the Emperor not enter Italy, that he provide the sum the king was owed for Naples, that he honour his prior commitment to marry the king's daughter Charlotte and that he restore the kingdom of Navarre to its king Henri II d'Albret.

On 19 October, the French army marched on Valenciennes. With reports of troubles being caused in Bapaume, François dispatched Saint-Pol, the seigneur de Fleuranges and the maréchal de La Palice to deal with the place. They took the town (and nearby châteaux) and torched it, razing the place. Meanwhile, Saint-Pol's brother delivered a similarly brutal fate to Landrecies. Having arrived at Haspres, between Cambrai and Valenciennes, François was made aware that now he had invaded Imperial territory, the Emperor had arrived in Valenciennes to oppose him.

The possibility of battle between the French and Imperials was now apparent. François dispatched men to build a bridge across the Scheldt to allow for the movement of troops. The Emperor responded by dispatching 12,000 landsknechts and 4,000 light horse to oppose the effort. However, by the time of the Imperial soldiers' arrival, Saint-Pol had already formed up with his soldiers in the marsh, and he was soon followed by the royal vanguard. Debate now raged in the royal camp, as to whether to offer battle to the Imperials. The duc de Bourbon, the vicomte de Thouars and the maréchal de La Palice were in favour. The seigneur de Coligny was opposed, and he carried the king in his opposition. That evening, the Emperor withdrew from the area. Despite his refusal of battle, François nevertheless allowed his captains to pursue the retreating Imperials to Valenciennes.

Saint-Pol's brother Vendôme secured Somain, and his cousin Bourbon secured Bouchain. Nassau's army meanwhile retreated to join the Imperial siege of Tournai, which was not defended by the royal army. By mid-November, François had returned to Compiègne where he united with his mother Louise and queen Claude.

=== Northern campaign of 1522 ===
Picard towns of relevance in the campaign of 1522, orange markers denote territories owned or conquered by the Anglo-Imperial alliance, blue markers denote strong French garrisons

For the winter, Saint-Pol's compagnie was to be quartered in Corbie. The winter would see many forces disbanded in the hopes of saving the crown money. Nevertheless, various skirmishes occurred over these months, most notably on 15 March 1522 when 1,200 landsknechts (German mercenaries) of Arras made to conduct some pillage across the river Authie. The French seigneur d'Estrées, responsible for the defence of Doullens sought to defeat this nearby raiding party. They clashed violently at night, leaving many dead. The men of Arras returned to the city from whence they had come empty handed. Imperial revenge was forthcoming quickly, with Doullens put to siege on 19 March. Vendôme, based out of Amiens, put out the call to Saint-Pol to bring 2,000 Swiss soldiers to the aid of Doullens. The Swiss baulked at the prospect on the grounds of pay, and Saint-Pol discharged the force back to their homes. Saint-Pol therefore turned to the soldiers of Hesdin, bringing 1,000 of them to bear against Doullens' besiegers. The arrival of this force from Hesdin caused the besieging soldiers to scatter, freeing the city.

Though negotiations with England had collapsed in 1521 in the Calais conference, François still held out hopes of building ties with king Henry VIII. Despite this, the French crown's debts to the English had gone unpaid since May 1521, as had the pensions owed to English princes such as cardinal Wolsey and the duke of Norfolk. This frustrated the English sovereign who complained to François. In January 1522, François had assured Henry he would abide by his promises. He would not however pay, and on 23 February, wrote to Henry asking the English king to join with him against the Emperor. On 28 May, Thomas Cheyney was sent to the French court in Lyon. He demanded François accept a truce with the Imperials, and if he did not, Henry would assume his mantle as protector of the Imperial Low Countries and declare war on him. The next day the king was accused of violating the treaty of London, failing to pay his debts, supporting the duke of Albany's practices against the English king. François dismissed the accusations defiantly.

On 26 May, the Emperor arrived in England, when he met with first cardinal Wolsey and then the king Henry. The two monarchs spent the next month between various royal residences. Together, the plans for an invasion of France, that they had discussed previously, were finalised.

Saint-Pol's brother, Vendôme, was conscious that Picardie had insufficient soldiers for a comprehensive defence of the province, even with the arrival of the vicomte de Thouars at the head of another 2,000 men. Thus, he concentrated his defence on several key towns: Boulogne, Thérouanne, Hesdin, Montreuil, Abbeville, and denuded the less defensible towns such as Ardres. With the English arrival delayed, the French took the initiative, torching Bapaume and its château in addition to pillaging the countryside of Artois. Meanwhile, the English arrived in Calais, but without their victuals (food supplies). The English forces in Picardie were commanded jointly by the duke of Suffolk and the earl of Surrey. Both Saint-Pol and the comte de Guise were tasked with containing them, and made first for Desvres and then Samer. This offensive thrust was brought to an end by the arrival of the English victuals, and now it would be for the French to defend what they had seized.

A council was held in Abbeville in October, at which a dispute which had arisen between Saint-Pol and the maréchal de Montmorency was discussed. Montmorency had been established as the commander of Saint-Pol's garrison in Doullens. Saint-Pol, fearing for his honour, refused to depart Doullens. Some at the council agreed with Saint-Pol's position, though Montmorency also had supporters.

The English force united with an Imperial one under the graaf van Buren (count of Buren). Together they secured the area from Saint-Omer to Ardres with little profit. Hesdin, viewed as one of the weaker cities still defended by a royal army was to be the target. Their batteries worked on the walls for fifteen days, and despite regular attacks by the comte de Guise and a certain Pontdormy successfully made a breach. Nevertheless, the poor weather and difficulty of the skirmishes they had been involved in dissuaded the coalition army from assaulting the breach. They turned their attention to Doullens, which Saint-Pol had abandoned after seizing its food supply and destroying its gates due to assessing it as a liability to defend. Doullens was torched by the army (in addition to the surrounding villages), while Saint-Pol held up in Corbie. Despite the devastation that the coalition army wrought, the campaign had offered little real conquest for the force. With the soldiers exhausted, and the weather a constant barrage of rain, the Anglo-Imperial army retreated into Artois for the winter.

During 1523, Saint-Pol would be relieved of his office as governor of the Île-de-France in favour of the return of his elder brother to the office.

=== Betrayal of the connétable ===
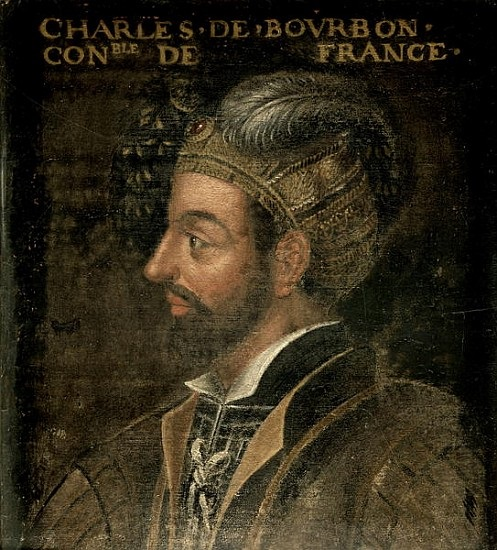
Duc de Bourbon, whose treason would besmirch Saint-Pol

The actions of François and his mother Louise, drove the connétable de Bourbon into treason through their hunger for his territories. From December 1522 to April 1523, it was Saint-Pol who led the attempts to reconcile his cousin Bourbon with the royal family.

In March 1523, the connétable de Bourbon was instructed to clear various bands of soldiers that menaced Champagne and Brie. The duc de Vendôme, comte de Saint-Pol and the vicomte de Thouars were to participate in this mission alongside him.

The Emperor, and his aunt, the governor of the Netherlands, speculated often on who might join Bourbon in his treason. Of particular focus in these talks were the king of Navarre, the duc de Lorraine, and Bourbon's cousins: the duc de Vendôme and comte de Saint-Pol.

In July 1523, François undertook preparations to lead a new campaign to see Milan reconquered. Around the same time, on 26 July, his mother, Louise was receiving information about the troubling actions of the connétable de Bourbon. A certain 'La Clayette' reported to her that the connétable was gathering soldiers at Chantelle and Carlat, with artillery and food supplies. Concerned about the possibility of Bourbon-Vendôme sympathies to these actions, the vicomte de Thouars was dispatched to keep an eye on Saint-Pol's brother Vendôme in Picardie.

On 12 August, the king was in Gien. He received a cryptic warning while there from the seigneur de La Vauguyon who informed him of Bourbon's treason in a round about way. Louise also received information through the seigneur de Maulévrier that one of the most important nobles of the kingdom, who was of royal blood, intended to betray the realm to foreign enemies, and endanger the king's life. This report reached Louise on 15 August and she dispatched men to her son François to inform him. They arrived while he was at Saint-Pierre-le-Moûtier on 16 August, confirming the duc's treason, though by this time, the king was already aware that the connétable had been in talks with England.

At this moment, Bourbon was convalescing with a sickness at Moulins. The king arrived in Moulins to speak with him, delaying his entry by a day under the excuse of a leg trouble, so as to have the area well scouted by the duc de Longueville. The two men met on 17 August, both putting on performances of normality for the other.

On 5 September several of Bourbon's accomplices were arrested, but no action was taken against the connétable at this moment. Feeling the noose tighten, Bourbon fled on the night of 8 September, emerging in Imperial territory before the end of the month.

A false rumour spread in an English correspondence of 12 November that Saint-Pol had taken flight with the connétable, and that as a result of his flight, the king had taken his brother the duc de Vendôme into custody. Though the king had doubted Vendôme and Saint-Pol in the immediate wake of Bourbon's treason, he soon reaffirmed his faith in the brothers after they demonstrated their continued loyalty.

=== Italian campaign of 1523–1524 ===
Concurrent to the betrayal of Bourbon, the amiral de Bonnivet had led part of the French army over the Alps. In the domestic circumstances, François chose not to follow him into the peninsula at the head of the army as he had planned. Thus, Bonnivet was made the leader of the army. He had with him 30,000 men including the maréchal de Montmorency, the chevalier Bayard, and Saint-Pol. Having crossed the Ticino (river), the force arrived before the walls of Milan. The amiral was inclined to negotiate with the Imperial commander Colonna, and this allowed him time to reinforce the defences of the city. The French siege that followed would consume the whole winter peppered with small skirmishes between the two camps. The French force continued to weaken, while the viceroy of Naples brought reinforcements into the city, along with the rebel connétable de Bourbon.

Come the spring of 1524, the Imperial army now outnumbered that of the French. Taking advantage of his new situation, the viceroy of Naples advanced on Bonnivet's camp at Abbiategrasso, almost surrounding him. Bonnivet and his force was able to extricate themselves from this precarious situation. Thus, a retreat was begun by the French army, abandoning Novara and Vercelli. The former place was reached in April, and was besieged by the Imperials for three weeks while an epidemic and poor supplies ravaged the army. The commander of the vanguard, the maréchal de Montmorency became so ill he had to be carried around in a litter. Novara was thus abandoned. The amiral de Bonnivet commanded the rear-guard which looked to stave off the Imperials, however he was wounded when an arquebus shot tore through his arm, and he had to hand over responsibility for the army to Saint-Pol. According to the memoirist Brantôme it was not actually his injury that caused his withdrawal from the army, but rather his fear that due to the vicious rivalry that he enjoyed with the duc de Bourbon, he believed that were he to fall into Imperial captivity he would be killed. Saint-Pol thus commanded the retreat back into France, which was a perilous one in the estimation of Nawrocki. During the retreat Saint-Pol commanded, his horse was shot from under him, as was that of his lieutenant Saint-Pol. As the retreating army crossed the Sesia, on 30 April the famous chevalier Bayard was fatally wounded. From Sesia, the army made first for Turin and then for the Alps. As the army crossed the Alps, the French and Swiss soldiers parted ways with one another, on abysmal terms. The cause of their dispute was matters of payment for the Swiss, and it was reported that they vowed never to work for the French again, and the French vowed never to trust the Swiss again.

Taking advantage of the plight of the French army, the connétable de Bourbon followed up the successful forcing of Italy by leading an invasion into the French province of Provence.

=== Swing of the pendulum ===
The invasion of the connétable de Bourbon started well. Vence, Antibes, Cannes, Grasse, Fréjus, Draguignan, Lorgues, Hyères and Brignoles all fell to him with scarcely a fight. Come the start of August, the duc de Bourbon found himself before the provincial capital of Aix. Aix fell to him on 9 August and he declared himself to be the comte de Provence. The capture of Marseille proved to be another matter. On 21 September, his breach through the walls was successfully fought off, in a further confoundment he was also running out of money. In these circumstances, he either had to face off against the royal army which was gathering, or withdraw back into Italy. He chose the latter course, and hurried back across the Alps, with a force under Montmorency and the maréchal de La Palice hot on his tail. While he was in Nice, the king, François, was departing from Avignon with 6,000 landsknechts, the king having resolved to lead the campaign into Italy personally overruling the fears of some about the security of the kingdoms other borders. With him for this grand campaign were the top flight of the French nobility: the king of Navarre, the duc d'Alençon, the comte de Saint-Pol, the duke of Albany, the duc de Longueville, the maréchaux de La Palice, de Montmorency and de Lautrec, the amiral de Bonnivet, the grand maître the comte de Tende, the seigneur de Lambesc (of the house of Lorraine) and many others.

Having split the royal army to cross the Alps into Italy, the entire force reunited before Pinerolo around 15 to 17 October in preparation to march on Milan. Saint-Pol was accompanied by his lieutenant, the seigneur d'Annebault for the campaign. The viceroy of Naples (de Lannoy) had few forces at his disposal, but nevertheless departed from Alessandria so that he might confront François' army. The connétable de Bourbon, who had also crossed the Alps made to join with de Lannoy. The French army reached Vercelli while the Imperial condotierri the marchese di Pescara was to be found in Montferrat. The Imperials would concentrate their forces in Lodi and Pavia. The French army arrived before Milan, entering the city at the same time as the Imperials evacuated the Lombard capital, making for Lodi and Pavia. The garrison of the Castello Sforzesco offered six days of resistance to the occupier. On 26 October, the French king was master of Milan, but had yet to cause any injury to the Imperial soldiers in the ducato.

=== Pavia ===
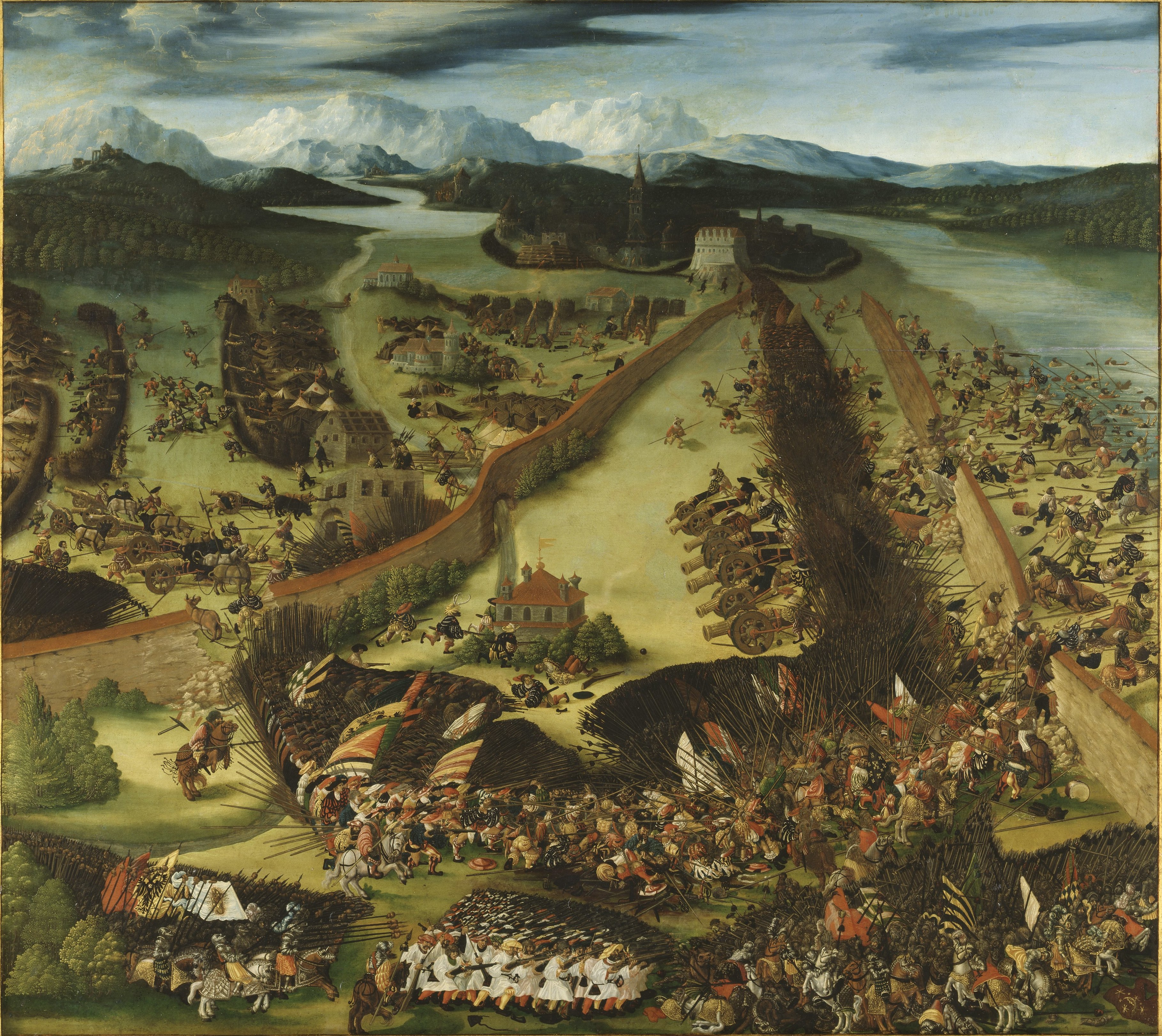
Catastrophic battle of Pavia that would be the ruin of the French army, and see Saint-Pol made captive

Course of the Pavia campaign

It was now to be resolved how to proceed, be it to attack Lodi or Pavia. The walls of Lodi were in a poor state, and the Spanish in the city were exhausted by their retreat from Marseille. The historian Jacquart assesses Lodi as having been a highly vulnerable target. Saint-Pol was among those who counselled a thrust against Lodi, alongside the maréchal de Montmorency, the seigneur de Fleuranges, and the vicomte de Thouars. Others (including the duc d'Alençon and the amiral de Bonnivet) thought differently, seeing more glory in striking at the well defended Pavia. The king found himself more in agreement with the latter camp, and thus from 27 October to early-November, Pavia was invested by the royal army. Montmorency established himself in the southern suburb with six thousand landsknechts, the maréchal de La Palice watching the road to Lodi in the east, Alençon occupied the Visconti Park to the north while the king was with the amiral de Bonnivet in the west.

The Emperor and connétable de Bourbon were not idle while the French were investing Pavia, and assembled such forces in the area that it could now be said that it was the French besiegers who found themselves besieged.

The Imperial forces entered the Visconti Park in the morning of 24 February, cavalry, landsknechts and Spaniards all. The French artillery opened on their foes around 7:20. Soon thereafter, the king led a charge into the Imperial line, the French cannons now risked killing their own, and ceased firing. The French landsknechts were destroyed by Imperial arquebusiers laying hidden in wait. The garrison of Pavia now sortied into the French rear. The French cavalry was isolated and destroyed.

Saint-Pol lay on the field after the battle. Covered in wounds and without his armour or clothing (save only for a shirt), a Spanish soldier, thinking him dead, decided to cut off his finger so that he might claim a ring from his hand. Saint-Pol awoke with a scream, and he was then recognised, and taken off for treatment by the victors.

The battle had been a disaster for the French, the kingdoms worst loss since Agincourt in 1415. The contemporary Florentine historian Guicciardini reported them as having lost 8,000 men to the Imperials 700, an alternate account puts the total dead at 6,000. Many of France's leading military officers had been killed on the field or mortally wounded: the vicomte de Thouars, the seigneur de Lambesc, the seigneur de Chaumont, the maréchaux de La Palice and de Lescun, the amiral de Bonnivet, the grand écuyer Sanseverino and the grand maître the comte de Tende (who was also the king's uncle).

In addition to the dead were the prisoners, around 2,000 of whom were imprisoned in Pavia. Saint-Pol was counted among their number, alongside the king of Navarre, the maréchal de Montmorency, the seigneur de Fleuranges, the seigneur de Brion, and the king himself who had been unhorsed and mobbed by Spanish soldiers. The nobles deemed of good quality, like those prior mentioned, were to be ransomed by their captors. Those prisoners deemed too poor were quickly released on the orders of the duc de Bourbon.

Saint-Pol was to be found captive in the hôtel of the marchesa do Escaldosal, where the maréchal de Lescun was also convalescing. Lescun would subsequently die of his wounds. Knecht describes his recovery as 'unexpected'. Having spent a little while in captivity, Saint-Pol effected an escape on 15 May after having bribed his guards.

=== Kingdom without a king ===
The duc d'Alençon who was at Pavia was able to avoid either capture or death, and returned to France. Not long after, on 15 April he died, without children. The queen mother Louise and chancellor Duprat conspired to ensure that the duc d'Orléans (second son of the king) would be his heir, instead of his sister (Françoise d'Alençon), who was Vendôme's wife. Having escaped from his captivity, Saint-Pol returned to France. He arrived in Paris during July. He was however able to do little to support the position of his brother Vendôme in his disputes with the regent Louise, the vicomte de Lautrec and the chancellor Duprat.

Once back in the capital, Saint-Pol was able to resolve the dispute over the government of Paris between his deputy (the archbishop of Aix) and the comte de Braine who the regent had sent to the capital in his absence to deal with bands of renegade soldiers.

During the regency of Louise while the king was captive, a dispute arose between the government and the parlement over the 1516 Concordat of Bologna, by which the 1438 Pragmatic Sanction of Bourges had been abrogated (changing appointments to church office from local chapter elections to royal appointment with Papal approval). The parlement, frustrated at the installation of a certain 'Chantereau' as abbot of Saint-Euverte rejected the decision to refer the matter to the grand conseil, which was chaired by the chancellor Duprat, who had been involved in a similar dispute earlier in the year over his appointment as archbishop of Sens. On 5 September, the parlement declared the grand conseils decision to be null and void, and declared that Chantereau should not receive the incomes of the abbey. That same day, the parlement resolved to write to Vendôme, the cardinal de Bourbon, Saint-Pol and the vicomte de Lautrec, hoping that they would be allies in the courts fight with Duprat. These letters would be sent out on 12 September. Their appeal indicated a hope that they would work to confound Duprat's ambitions, and preserve the authority of the king, Louise, the court and justice. Duprat would however enjoy total backing from the regent.

On 30 August, a treaty was negotiated with England known as the Treaty of the More. A payment of 2,000,000 écus to the English formed part of this treaty, and there were several guarantors for this payment: the duc de Vendôme, the comte de Saint-Pol, the cardinal de Bourbon and the duc de Longueville.

By the terms of the treaty of Madrid, the French king abandoned his rights to Bourgogne, his Italian claims and those in Artois. The king of Navarre was to renounce his claims to the Navarrese kingdom, and the connétable de Bourbon and his allies were to be restored to their properties and titles.

Two possible scenarios for the liberty of king François were offered by the Emperor. In the one scenario his provisional liberty would be secured in return for both his first and second eldest sons being traded in as hostages in his stead. In the other scenario the king's eldest son and 'twelve principle personages' would be demanded (the duc de Vendôme, the duke of Albany, the vicomte de Lautrec, the comte de Saint-Pol and the maréchal de Montmorency chief among them). This was not a difficult decision for either François or his regent mother. Faced with the potential loss of the kingdom's remaining military captains, or the king's sons the latter was quickly chosen.

=== Settling affairs ===
The exchange of the king for his two sons transpired by boats between Hendaye and Hondarribia on the French border with Spain on 17 March 1526. By this means, François returned to his kingdom. He arrived in Bayonne on 21 March and then made for Bordeaux. A first priority for the king was to redistribute the various charges made vacant by the slaughter of the nobility at Pavia. On 23 March, the seigneur de Brion was made amiral (in lieu of Bonnivet) and lieutenant-général de Bourgogne (in lieu of the vicomte de Thouars); the maréchal de Montmorency was established as the grand maître (in lieu of the comte de Tende) and governor of Languedoc (in lieu of the rebel duc de Bourbon); the seigneur de Fleuranges was established as a maréchal; Galiot de Genouillac was made grand écuyer (in lieu of Sanseverino); the grand sénéchal of Normandie (who had reported Bourbon's treason) was elevated to governor of Normandie (in lieu of the duc d'Alençon); finally the comte de Saint-Pol was made governor of Dauphiné (in lieu of the maréchal de La Palice). This appointment came into effect on 7 May 1526; he would hold the office for the remainder of his life. There was also various other figures who saw elevations of some variety. In assessing the reshaping of the royal orbit in the wake of Pavia, Le Fur suggests the number of Pavia survivors who feature among it is indicative of a need of the king to be surrounded by men who were dependent on him for their 'careers and fortunes', and were of a young enough age that they would need to make future demonstrations of their loyalty.

The funeral of François' queen Claude, and their daughter the princess Louise had been delayed due to the war was at last resolved in 1526. During the final days of October 1526 a procession accompanied the bodies from Blois to Paris featuring among the mourners the duc de Vendôme, the comte de Saint-Pol and the maréchal de Lautrec. A funeral would be held at the Notre Dame on 5 November.

On 11 July 1527, cardinal Wolsey arrived in Calais in grand style. The English grandee was greeted by François and his court before Amiens on 4 August. With the king outside the city were the cardinal de Bourbon, the duc de Vendôme and the comte de Saint-Pol, also present was the grand maître Montmorency, and various other men of the church and nobles. They entered the city to a rapturous reception. It would be Saint-Pol that fetched the cardinal for one of his meetings with the king, and Wolsey would mention the presence near the king of the three Bourbon-Vendôme brothers in his recollections of the meetings. A treaty was drawn up on 18 August by which the peace of the previous April was renewed. This peace would be sealed by a marriage between the king of England's daughter Mary and François' second son the duc d'Orléans. Both kings would collaborate towards the release of the French king's two sons either through a ransom or if this was refused by the Emperor, with force of arms. It was further agreed that the two would work towards the liberation of the Pope (something the French were already campaigning in Italy to achieve). François promised to support the English king with the repudiation of his marriage. François alerted Wolsey to the fact he intended to violate the treaty of Madrid he had made with the Emperor. Both the official and unofficial components of the peace were celebrated in Amiens Cathedral on 20 August.

François took a very dim view of the actions the parlement had taken in his absence. This related to their opposition to the Concordat of Bologna and to their remonstrances against Louise, the regent. As concerned the parlements roadblocks to the appointment of the chancellor Duprat as archbishop of Sens and abbot of Saint-Benoît, he endorsed the position of the regent, and the parlement assented to this without continued protest. In December 1526, four conseillers were summoned before the king and several grandees (including the king of Navarre, the duc de Vendôme, the comte de Saint-Pol, the duc de Longueville, and the duke of Albany among others. There, the men pleaded their case as to why they had allegedly defied Louise, Duprat and Vendôme's council. A week after this meeting, the men were suspended from the parlement. The proceedings that critiqued the chancellor were struck from the record. On 24 July 1527, the king held a lit de justice (a special session of the parlement presided over by the king). The king was surrounded by various pairs, and the great officers of state. The président Guillart spoke for the court. Rather than backing down, his speech represented in large part a continuity with the remonstrances that had been presented to Louise in 1525. He urged François to lead the fight against 'heresy', to suppress venal office (purchased office), create no new offices nor evoke affairs up to the purview of his council. He concluded by recognising that while François as king, was above all laws, that nevertheless he should exercise restraint and only use his power to pursue worthy and just things.

That same day, the king's council responded to Guillart's remonstrance. Those involved in the council were the king François, the king of Navarre, Saint-Pol and his brother the duc de Vendôme, Galiot de Genouillac, the seigneur de Maulévrier, the archbishop of Bourges, the sécretaire (secretary of state) Robertet, the chancellor Duprat and the grand maître Montmorency. Their resolution was read before the court that afternoon: the court should only concern itself with justice, not matters of state, the court was to have no cognisance over the Concordat of Bologna, all decisions of Louise during her regency were confirmed and upheld. The court was not to modify any royal ordonnances, nor did it have any jurisdiction over the chancellor. Two days following this explosive encounter, François held a new lit de justice in which the connétable de Bourbon was tried both for rebellion and lèse majesté. Ambassadors were invited on 27 July for the judgement in which the duc, (who had died besieging Rome on 6 May), was damned, with his arms to be struck, and all his lands either reverted or forfeit. These acts of authority over the parlement were concluded with the recording of the royal council's response to the parlement of 24 July.

== Italian campaign ==
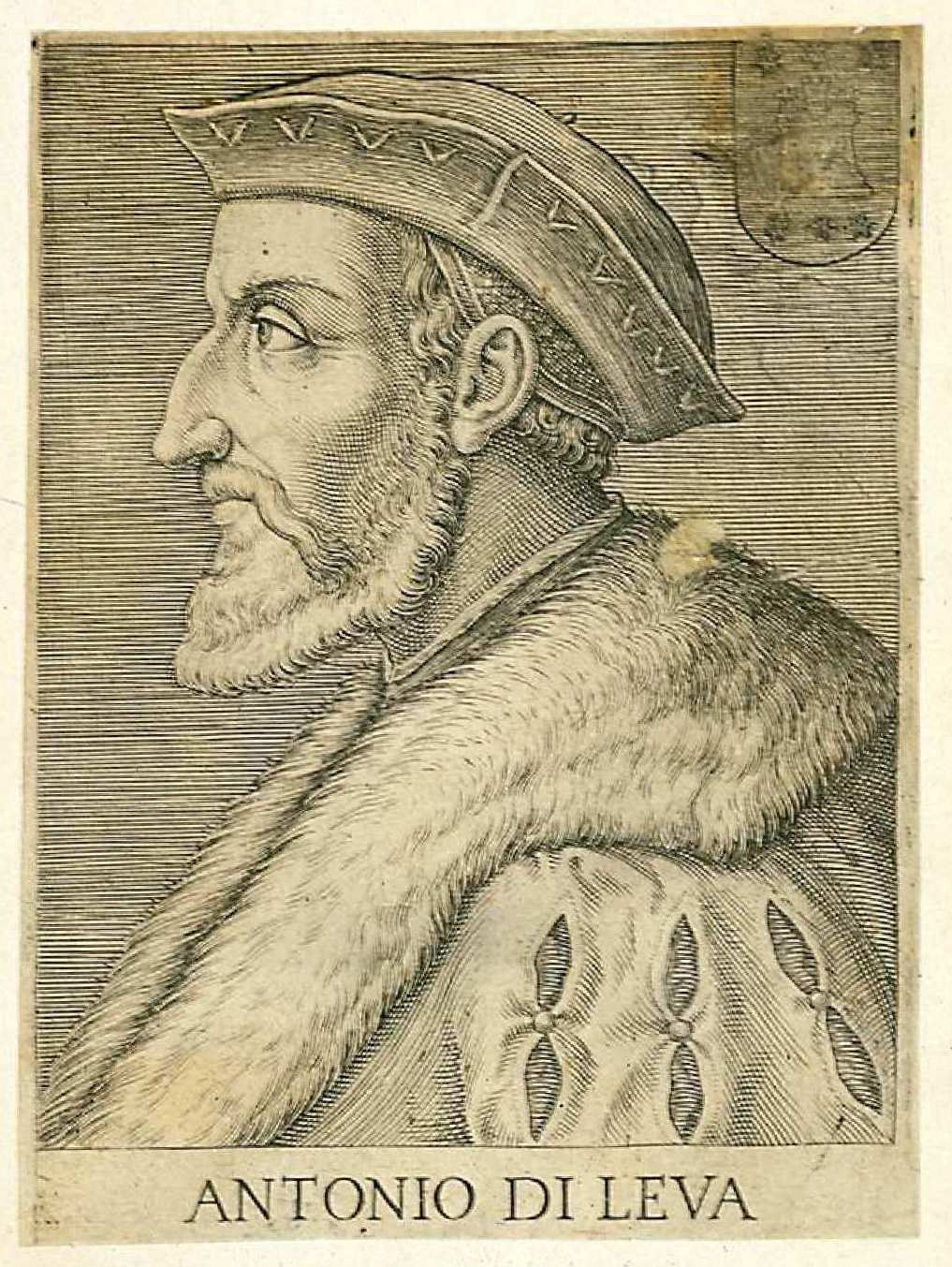
de Leyva, adversary and vanquisher of Saint-Pol in his northern Italian campaign

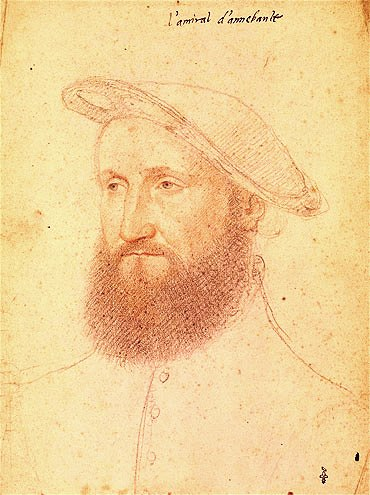
Seigneur d'Annebault who would serve as lieutenant to Saint-Pol for the campaign

Though François had violated the treaty of Madrid he agreed to in captivity, the Emperor was not in a position to claim the province of Bourgogne from him. On 22 May 1526, the French king entered into a 'Holy League' with the Italian principalities of Venice, Florence, the Papacy and Sforza (formerly the duca di Milano), known to history as the League of Cognac. The goal of the League was to 'liberate northern Italy' from its Imperial occupation, and if the Emperor proved hostile to the League (for it was not technically declared to be hostile to him), the kingdom of Naples would be wrested away and allocated to a new prince by the Pope.

As part of the following war of the League of Cognac, two French armies were dispatched across the Alps in turn. The first of these was under the authority of the vicomte de Lautrec. This army was to march into the peninsula to protect both the Papal States and the Campania (south western area of the Italian mainland). The army would also be able to avenge the recent sack of Rome by the Imperials. Susa was reached on 31 July 1527 and from here the army struck into Lombardy, conquering Alessandria in Piedmont before marching first to Milan and then Naples. Having arrived in Naples and put the place to siege, the army was bedevilled by plague and the defection of the Genoese from the French cause. Pay was also to be found in short supply and the armies morale was poor. On the night of 15 August 1528, a month after the second French army under Saint-Pol entered the peninsula, the commander Lautrec died of the plague. The army defaulted to the authority of the marchese di Saluzzo (marquis of Saluzzo), who quickly raised the siege. At the head of around 7,000 men, Saluzzo began a retreat from Naples on 29 August, however the army was arranged poorly, allowing it to be set upon with ease by the Imperials. Only 3,000 soldiers made it to the nearby town of Aversa. On 30 August all places held by the French and Venetians in the kingdom of Naples were surrendered, Saluzzo would die in captivity. What was left of the army of Naples made its way north to Savona on the Ligurian coast, which was held by the French captain de Morette.

=== Soldiers and their leader ===
The second army to be sent into Italy was under the command of the comte de Saint-Pol. He was to have between eight and ten thousand landsknechts, two thousand foot, five hundred lances and five hundred light cavalry. Despite these grand ambitions, when the army in fact assembled in Lyon in June, it would be of a less grandiose size, even after being reinforced by several thousand Gascons.

The total cost of the armies operation is put by Le Fur at around 60,000 ducats per month. This sum was to be provided half by the English, a further 12,000 by the Venetians and the remaining 18,000 ducats by the other members of the League of Cognac. The seigneur de Sassy was to serve as an intermediary between his army and the French court, however, with the illness of the seigneur de Lésigny, Sassy assumed more fiscal responsibilities for the expedition.

His lieutenant for the invasion would be the seigneur d'Annebault (who had formerly been the lieutenant of his compagnie d'ordonannce). Saint-Pol had serving under him the trésorier de France en Languedoc (treasurer of France in Languedoc), named the seigneur de Lésigny. On the financial side he also had the services of a certain Jehan Laguette (a trésorier de l'extraordinaire des guerres - extraordinary treasurer for the wars). This figure would through the taking of loans, provide 17,795 livres for the army from April to June 1529, which constituted 10% of the expenditure of his account.

While on campaign, Saint-Pol and his army kept in contact with the French court. During these years, the grand maître de Montmorency had placed himself at the centre of an international network, receiving reports from the various French captains in the field, and ensuring their logistical needs were met. During the Saint-Pol campaign into Italy, the grand maître would receive letters from the seigneur de Sassy and the seigneur de Lésigny in the Milanais. Saint-Pol himself wrote to the grand maître up until the point of his capture at Landriano in 1529.

Saint-Pol's army credited itself well at Grenoble on the near side of the Alps, from where Saint-Pol wrote to the court on 13 July.

=== Crossing into Italy ===
Lombard towns of relevance in Saint-Pol's 1528–1529 campaign
Piedmont towns of relevance in Saint-Pol's 1528–1529 campaign

This force crossed the Alps in July 1528. It was to assist the French army already in Naples and shield those forces from any northern Imperial attack. Saint-Pol entered Piedmont, and would follow the path of the Po river towards Pavia. The situation was evolving rapidly however, with the southern army having evaporated by the end of August. The collapse of the French army in southern Italy meant that Saint-Pol now stood alone for the French in the peninsula, with only the prospect of Venetian and Milanese reinforcements.

Saint-Pol's army commended itself at Asti. He was to be found in the city on 23 July. He was waiting there for the armies Swiss mercenaries to arrive, who were proving slow to unify with him. He had also found it necessary to supply more on food than anticipated, due to the devastation Lombardy was experiencing.^{α}

While Saint-Pol was spinning his wheels in Asti, the herzog von Braunschweig-Lüneburg (duke of Braunschweig-Lüneberg) had been leading an Imperial campaign of reconquest in the north of the peninsula. He swept through the towns and fortifications around lake Garda, before rendezvousing with the Spanish governor of Milan the príncipe de Ascoli (prince of Ascoli - known as de Leyva). De Leyva was able to secure a commitment from Braunschweig-Lüneburg to restore to the Imperial fold the city of Lodi, which he put to siege on 20 June. Troubles with food, epidemic and money made the endeavour a costly one and soldiers began to slip away. On 13 July after a new assault on the walls failed to yield results, more of his soldiers mutinied. After the dust cleared, De Leyva had only 2,000 soldiers left with him. With no subsidy from the Emperor, Braunschweig-Lüneberg would depart from Italy back to Austria.

Alessandria was a city of strategic importance. From Alessandria, a French army could make for Milan (via Pavia), descend on Genoa or penetrate into the Papal lands through Bologna. Saint-Pol wrote to the grand maître Montmorency from this place.

According to Sournia, sometime before the collapse of the siege of Naples, Saint-Pol was conducting a siege of the Castello Sforzesco (Sforza Castle) of Milan, the only fortification that had not been subdued in the ducato di Milano.

Saint-Pol linked up with the allied army of the League of Cognac (under the command of the duca di Urbino (duke of Urbino) on 22 August a little way from Pavia. De Leyva established himself north of their position, near Marignano, before retreating to Milan on 28 August. The league army entered Landriano where they considered how to proceed: strike against Milan, or against Pavia? Their scouts reported unfavourable weather on route to Milan, so it was resolved to make for Pavia. The prince neared the city on 9 September.

In Genoa, the situation was proceeding poorly for the French. The maréchal de Trivulzio, governor of the city for France had withdrawn to the citadel of the city for fear of the plague which was ravaging the country, many of his soldiers had withdrawn from the city. The time was ripe for the Genoese commander Andrea Doria to strike. Fearing this, the French fleet in Genoa withdrew to Savona. With the fleet gone, Doria entered Genoa on 12 September. Trivulzio, held up in the citadel, and appealed to Saint-Pol for support.

As the situation was collapsing on the Italian Riviera, Saint-Pol was having continued success in his own endeavours. On 19 September, Pavia fell to him. The victory had been hard fought, and had seen the death of notable nobles, such as the seigneur de Lorges. Due to the fact Pavia was a former part of the French fold (only having been conquered by De Leyva in May) Saint-Pol's conquest of the city was a brutal one, with the city destroyed and pillaged. To the horror of the Venetian soldiers, women were raped and the population massacred.

Saint-Pol moved to Alessandria with the consent of the duca di Milano (duke of Milan) shortly after the loss of Genoa. From here he considered supporting French held Savona.

During the French occupation of Savona - which had begun in 1526 - the Ligurian town fancied that it might prove a rival to the great republic of Genoa (indeed the French conquest of Genoa had come out Savona in 1527). Now that Genoa was independent of France once more, Genoese forces made to reduce the upstart Savona. On 21 October 1528, de Morette capitulated control of this port city. The victorious Genoese destroyed the port and razed the fort of the town. With Savona's fall, one of its captains, Lignac, a commander of a compagnie d'ordonannce, made to join with Saint-Pol's army. Having linked up with the commander, he complained continuously about his lack of men and resources. His letters also suggested tension within the French command.

Saint-Pol ordered one of his subordinates, the seigneur de Montjean to make for Genoa with 3,000 infantry and some cavalry, in the hope of linking up with Trivulzio's army. At this point, Trivulzio's army had already been dispersed. His thrust coming alone, Montjean was driven off.

Not long after Savona was reduced, on 28 October, Trivulzio capitulated in the citadel of Genoa.

Subsequently, Saint-Pol resolved to lead the recapture of Genoa, however this effort failed in December, at the cost of many men. The plague was partly responsible for the losses of soldiers as well as the combat. There was further the trouble that due to a lackadaisical attitude towards the pay of the mercenaries, they were bleeding away in numbers also. For want of pay he had to dismiss many of his soldiers with the coming of winter.

=== Collapse of French Italy ===
By the time for campaigning in the spring, Saint-Pol had around 4,000 foot, two hundred light horse under the seigneur de Boissy, and another two hundred light horse under the seigneur d'Annebault. Annebault also had fifty lances that Nawrocki deduces to be from the comte de Maulévrier's compagnie, and the seigneur de Montjean offered another fifty alongside some landsknechts. There were also two condotierri (a form of contractual mercenaries popularised in the Italian peninsula) of the Gonzaga family. In addition to the paucity of numbers, the quality of the soldiers under his command was assessed as being only middling. Though his army diminished, it nevertheless succeeded in the reconquest of Mortara and the Castello di Novara (Castle of Novara). The reconquest and sacking of Mortara was accomplished by the French army around April to May 1529 in a period of action for the army that the historian Duc characterises as 'dithering'.

François' promises of new support for Saint-Pol's army did not materialise. For De Leyva in Milan, he could count on around 6,000 soldiers of which 4,000 were veterans. Well supplemented in his forces by the Emperor, De Leyva could think of attack. De Leyva's army now swept through the west of the Milanese duchy, recapturing the majority of what was before them. To have any success against the Imperials it would be necessary for Saint-Pol to unify his forces with those of the duca di Urbino and the Venetians. Together they could constitute a force of 20,000 (according to De Leyva: 17,000 foot, 2,000 cavalry and 800 men-at-arms). Therefore, Saint-Pol made for Pavia capturing the places from Ticino to the Po held by the Imperials. De Leyva was unable to prevent the unification of this force and was compelled to withdraw to Milan in June 1529. The prospect of the French recapture of the ducato now seemed a plausible possibility. Without engaging the French, the Imperial commander regularly put his soldiers in the field to probe at their defences. Urbino refused to mount an attack on Milan, and the former duca di Milano suggested the army be dispersed, according to the historian Duc he proposed that the Venetians make for Monza, the French for Abbiategrasso and his own adherents for Alessandria. According to Le Fur, the Venetians left to defend Cassano, Sforza for Pavia (so that he might subdue Milan through starvation) and the French for Abbiategrasso. The historian Sournia suggests that at this time Saint-Pol was in fact besieging Milan.

Emboldened by word from François that he intended to send a new army into the peninsula, and with De Leyva in retreat, Saint-Pol resolved to make a new attempt to capture Genoa in June, so that he might link up with a landing French army, and punish the republic for its defection. For want of pay, Saint-Pol's soldiers were near mutiny by this point.

Ill fortune plagued the army as it passed by Landriano on 19 June, the passage slowed by the rain saturated rivers which made the transfer of the artillery across challenging. Some of the artillery fell into a ditch on 21 June. De Leyva had emerged from Milan, and was now in pursuit of the withdrawing French army. Saint-Pol had the rest of the army continue on while he stayed to see the artillery rescued with 1,500 landsknechts. De Leyva seized the moment, marching through the night with his soldiers to catch the French rear-guard before falling upon them. The surprise of the Imperial army, all dressed in white, saw the German mercenaries quickly scatter. Though Saint-Pol and his companions attempted to charge their enemy (thereby allowing some soldiers to escape to the main force in Pavia), they were defeated, and forced to surrender. Though his army had come to ruin in this crushing battle, the historian Michon notes that the commander commended himself by his bravery in the combat.

The captive Saint-Pol was brought to De Leyva and held prisoner in Milan. Saint-Pol would have a ransom attached to his release.

In the absence of Saint-Pol, command of the remaining French force defaulted to the seigneur d'Annebault. From Pavia, on 22 June, Annebault wrote to the French king, bemoaning the fact Saint-Pol had written to the French court many times on matters of his soldiers pay, and then recounted what had befallen them. The forces remaining of the army were by now three hundred French soldiers, a thousand Swiss, five hundred landsknechts and one hundred and fifty Italians. In an ambitious attempt, Annebault and some companions would attempt to free him.

Annebault would draw together the remaining French forces and travelled to Venice in the hopes of raising new mercenaries to supplement the army. Having perhaps completed this Venetian enterprise he then returned to Piedmont and established himself in Asti at the end of July, from where he could menace Milan, though his troops now numbered in the mere hundreds. Here he waited for orders from the king. With the queen mother Louise negotiating with the Imperials in Cambrai, his objective was to put enough pressure on Milan to afford a favourable bargaining position. Nawrocki speculates, that with Saint-Pol writing to Annebault from his captivity in Milan, he might have suggested Asti as a worthy location to hold up to his lieutenant. Annebault would then withdraw to Piedmont. On 26 August a truce came into effect. As the army was retreating across the Alps, they learned of the peace between France and the Holy Roman Empire. With the coming of peace, Annebault returned to France. By the terms of Cambrai, much of the treaty of Madrid was confirmed, notably the renouncing of French jurisdiction over Artois and Flanders. The major difference was the Emperors abandonment of his claim to Bourgogne, and the agreement of a ransom for the king's two sons. Those positions in northern Italy conquered during the last war by the French were to be abandoned, along with the Valois claims to Milan and Asti.

The captive prince would gain his liberty with the Peace of Cambrai. Along with the grand maître de Montmorency he looked to see Annebault rewarded for his service. It was agreed by the Imperials in this year that the comté de Saint-Pol was to be restored to his mother Marie de Luxembourg, but it would not be redeemed in the end.

On 21 September, De Leyva put Pavia to siege, and it was surrendered to him by its commander (much to the fury of the exiled duca di Milano). A comprehensive series of Imperial sieges followed. The destruction of Saint-Pol's army meant that now Milan and Genoa were now both back in the Imperial fold.

The historian Le Fur summarises the campaigns of 1527 to 1529 very dimly for the French king. He argues they consumed money, lives, and many of his leading captains who had survived Pavia. Moreover, Italy was left in ruins, and the Emperor was victorious. The Pope, abandoning the prospect of neutrality, now looked to the Emperor, who he saw as the only potentate capable of halting the Ottomans, combatting heresy and restoring Medici power in Florence.

== Favourite ==
=== Return of the children ===
The royal children, who had spent four years in captivity were exchanged back into France in 1530. On 4 July, they arrived in Dax. François had arrived in Bordeaux in mid-June, and received word of the successful return of his sons on 2 July from the seigneur de Montpezat. According to the royal propaganda, François was overcome with joy at the revelation, but as a good Christian, recognising god was the source of all good things, knelt to pray. For a long time no words came due to the tears that overwhelmed him, before he regained his composure and started praying. His supposed private prayer was quickly published. The great seigneurs were then to have entered the room where François was: the king of Navarre, the duc de Vendôme, the duc de Guise and the comte de Saint-Pol. All fell to weeping and prayers of thanks. Meanwhile, Bordeaux was overwhelmed with celebration. On 6 July, the king was reunited with his sons, supposedly waking them with kisses.

Having arrived near Bordeaux on 10 July, the royal party, of François, his new queen Éléonore, and the royal children made their entry by boat into the capital of Guyenne. The most ostentatious boats were reserved for the royal family. Lesser boats carried the nobles of the court into Bordeaux. The queen then entered the city of Bordeaux in a litter, with the dauphin and duc d'Orléans on horseback, and the duc de Vendôme, the comte de Saint-Pol, the duc de Nemours, the duc de Guise and the comte de Nevers with them. The streets were hung with tapestries and displays one of which was devoted to the new queen.

When, on 2 April 1532, the duc de Bretagne (title of the dauphin) who was the governor of Normandie, made his entry into Caen, he was followed on the following day by the king and a gilded royal suite of around 300 men containing the king of Navarre, the comte de Saint-Pol, the duc de Nemours, the duc de Longueville, the marchese di Saluzzo (marquis of Saluzzo) and the seigneur d'Annebault.

On 1 August 1533, the king made his entry into Toulouse. Several days later, on 4 August, he held a lit de justice in the parlement. With him for this occasion was a whole host of great nobles, who in order of protocol including: his three sons, the king of Navarre, the duc de Vendôme, the comte de Saint-Pol, the comte de Nevers, the duc de Guise and the grand maître Montmorency. After these men were to be found the chancellor, the prelates, and the parlementaires.

The Pope, Clement VII met with François for the marriage of the former's niece Catherine with François' son the duc d'Orléans. The two were married in Marseille on 28 October in a ceremony filled with extravagant pomp. On 7 December, Clement established seven new cardinals, among them the fifteen-year-old nephew of the grand maître de Montmorency. Six days of talks between the Pope and François followed before the king left to make for Avignon. Upon arriving in the city of Romans, the royal party (among whom was the king, the duc d'Orléans, Catherine, the queen, the comte de Saint-Pol and the chancellor Duprat) were jointly awarded a joyous entry. Several days of festivities followed. By this means Romans hoped to celebrate the peace and concord of the moment.

On the morning of 18 October, Paris was shocked to find that Protestant placards had been placed up in the night in many places (including in other towns along the Loire and in the château d'Amboise where the king was staying) which made attacks against the practice of the mass. The response to this affront was hysteria, with fears that the Protestants would soon massacre Catholics. Persecution of Protestantism was quickly redoubled. Suspects for the placards were arrested, and burnings at the stake soon followed. François for his part acted with zeal, congratulating the authorities on their thorough response, and establishing a special commission to try Protestants. Not long after François had returned to the capital, a second scandal erupted when copies of a text elaborating on the argument of the placards were discovered. In response to this François banned printing and organised a procession. This procession would go ahead on 21 January 1534 and was a spectacular affair, featuring both the royal court and the corporate bodies of the capital in a great display of piety. Among those who participated was Saint-Pol. François gave a speech in which he urged the people to denounce heretics, even if they were close with them. The day concluded with several more burnings, though the king did not tarry in the capital to witness them.

=== War in Piedmont ===
Having established himself in Lyon on 14 January 1536, François resolved to open new hostilities with the Emperor. The duca di Milano (duke of Milan) had died without heir a few months prior on 1 November 1535, and François was keen to receive what he believed had been promised to him. He himself had renounced his rights to the territory, and therefore sought to claim the ducato in the name of his second son, the duc d'Orléans. This assault on the empire would be initiated with an attack against the duca di Savoia. Though he was in fact the king's maternal uncle, Savoia had earned François' ire by his close relationship with the Emperor, and refusal to grant Nice for the king's interview with pope Clement VII and the Medici marriage in 1533. Having summoned Savoia to comply, only to be refused, French soldiers (numbering 40,000) were unleashed into Savoy under various commanders. Saint-Pol stormed Bugey, Bresse and Valromey without a fight before entering Savoy. To Saint-Pol's vexation, after a long discussion in council, it was agreed to establish the amiral de Chabot as lieutenant-général for the campaign. Chabot departed court on 6 March to assume this charge, and, refusing to serve under the amiral, Saint-Pol retired to France on 23 March. The amiral attacked Savoy and Piedmont. Chabot's advance penetrated deep, securing Turin at the end of March, and by mid-April arriving at Vercelli before Milan. He was then ordered to stop, the king hoping that the successful conquests against Savoia might be used as a bargaining chip with the Emperor to receive Milan by trade for their return. The campaign had been an easy one, and the new légionnaires had maintained a fair level of discipline.

The Emperor was not inclined for a trade, and led an invasion of Provence, and concurrently the Flemish invaded Picardie. Montmorency ensured the Provençal land before the Emperor's advance was scorched and emptied.

In September, François resolved on the necessity of strengthening the northern frontier either by the recovery of the comté de Saint-Pol or indeed the whole of Artois. Montmorency was tasked with leading this operation, with the assistance of the seigneur d'Annebault. The comté de Saint-Pol had in prior conflicts been considered to be under safeguard, however François took a different tack in 1537 on the grounds that the territory had been exchanged to him by Saint-Pol and his mother Marie in return for the duché d'Estouteville.

Annebault began campaigning in the north west of the kingdom alongside the duc de Guise in early-1537. Hesdin fell to the forces under Montmorency on 7 April. With success at Hesdin, François commanded Annebault to seize the town of Saint-Pol. Without much difficulty, the seigneur d'Annebault seized Saint-Pol, its château and its surrounding lands. An Imperial counterstroke quickly followed, with Saint-Pol coming under Imperial siege in turn, before being subjected to fire and pillage in June. On 30 July, a ten-month suspension of arms for Picardie and Artois was agreed between the French and the Imperials, with François to maintain control of Hesdin, and the Emperor control of the town of Saint-Pol. As part of this truce, it was agreed that the French would withdraw from Saint-Pol and not fortify any places, while the Imperials would terminate their siege of Thérouanne.

On 17 February 1538, François permitted a duel to take place between the sieur de Sarzay and the sieur de Véniers. Sarzay had accused the sieur de La Tour Landry of cowardice at Pavia, and claimed Véniers as his source for this charge. Véniers strongly disputed this. Thus, the two men resolved to duel for their respective honours. François had chosen Moulins as the venue for the two men's duel. Saint-Pol had a ceremonial role to play in this duel, wielding a halberd in a fine velvet suit, alongside Annebault, the comte de Nevers and the connétable de Montmorency. After a little while, François stopped the fight, awarded both participants 500 écus and declared that La Tour Landry was not guilty of cowardice. Véniers, who had been wounded, would die soon after however.

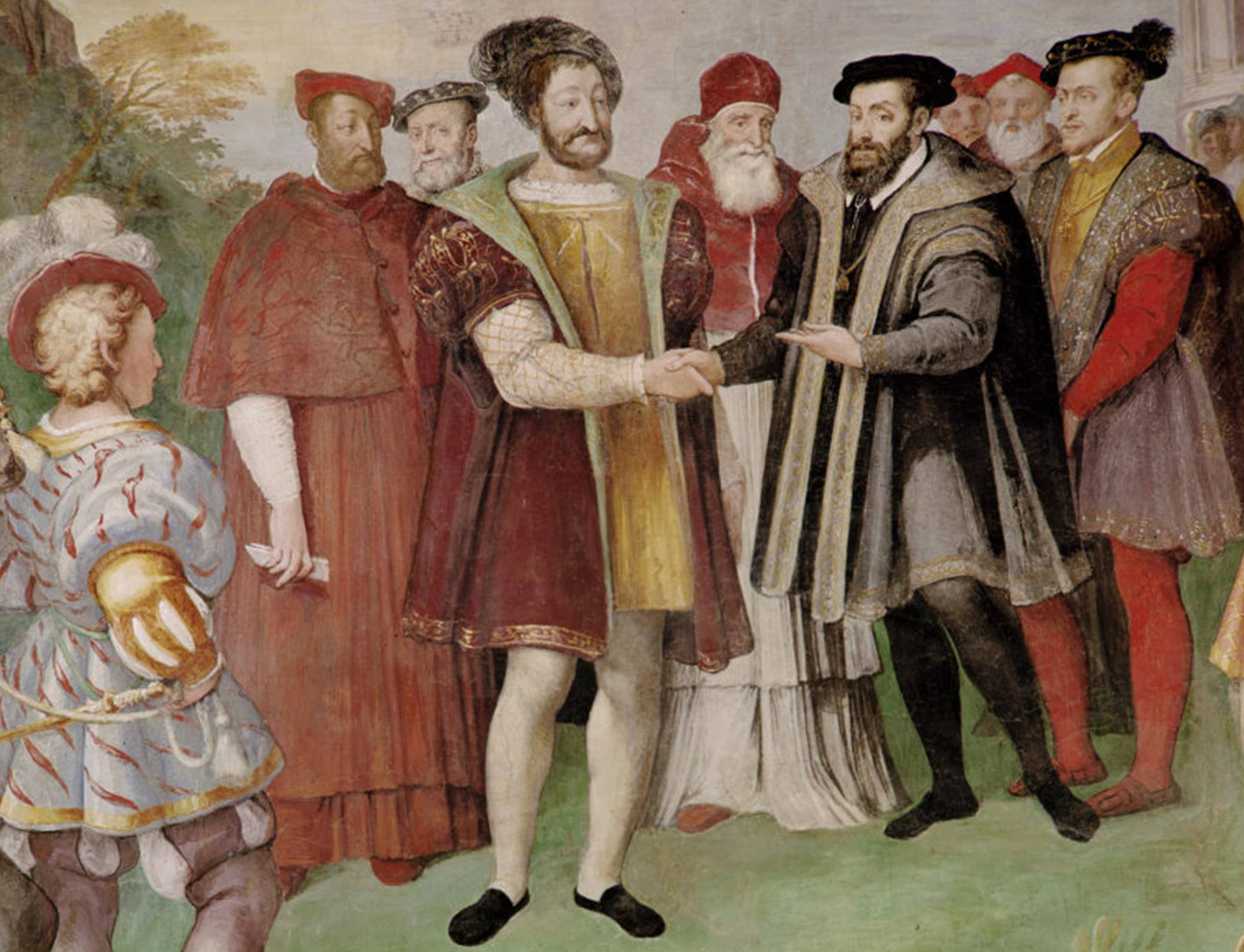
François I and the Holy Roman Emperor at the signing of the truce of Nice

Negotiations between the French and Imperials in various conferences succeeded in securing a ten-year truce between the two powers in June 1538. François refused to meet with the Emperor however during these negotiations, which succeeded thanks to the efforts of the pope Paul III. The connétable de Montmorency, and the French queen (sister to the Emperor) triumphed in arranging a meeting between the two sovereigns which was to transpire at Aigues-Mortes from 14 to 15 July.

For the meeting between François and the Emperor, Saint-Pol, along with the cardinal de Lorraine and connétable de Montmorency were to be found in the galley of the king as it approached that of the Emperor. In Aigues-Mortes the two potentates exchanged tokens of friendship and resolved to pave over their differences. François was nevertheless determined still to see Milan secured, seeing the best path now to be that of diplomacy.

On 15 October 1538, the king was at the hôtel de Montmorency to observe the entry of the Emperor into Paris. With him for the occasion were the cardinal de Lorraine and the connétable de Montmorency. Both men had played key roles in the establishing of détente with the Emperor. Later at the reception in the Louvre, Lorraine was to be found with the king in conversation at a balcony alongside the other two figures that the historian Michon characterises as the key royal favourites of the hour, Saint-Pol and the duchesse d'Étampes.

Saint-Pol held a key place in a religious procession in June 1539, where he was to be found right alongside the connétable.

=== Seesaw of favour ===
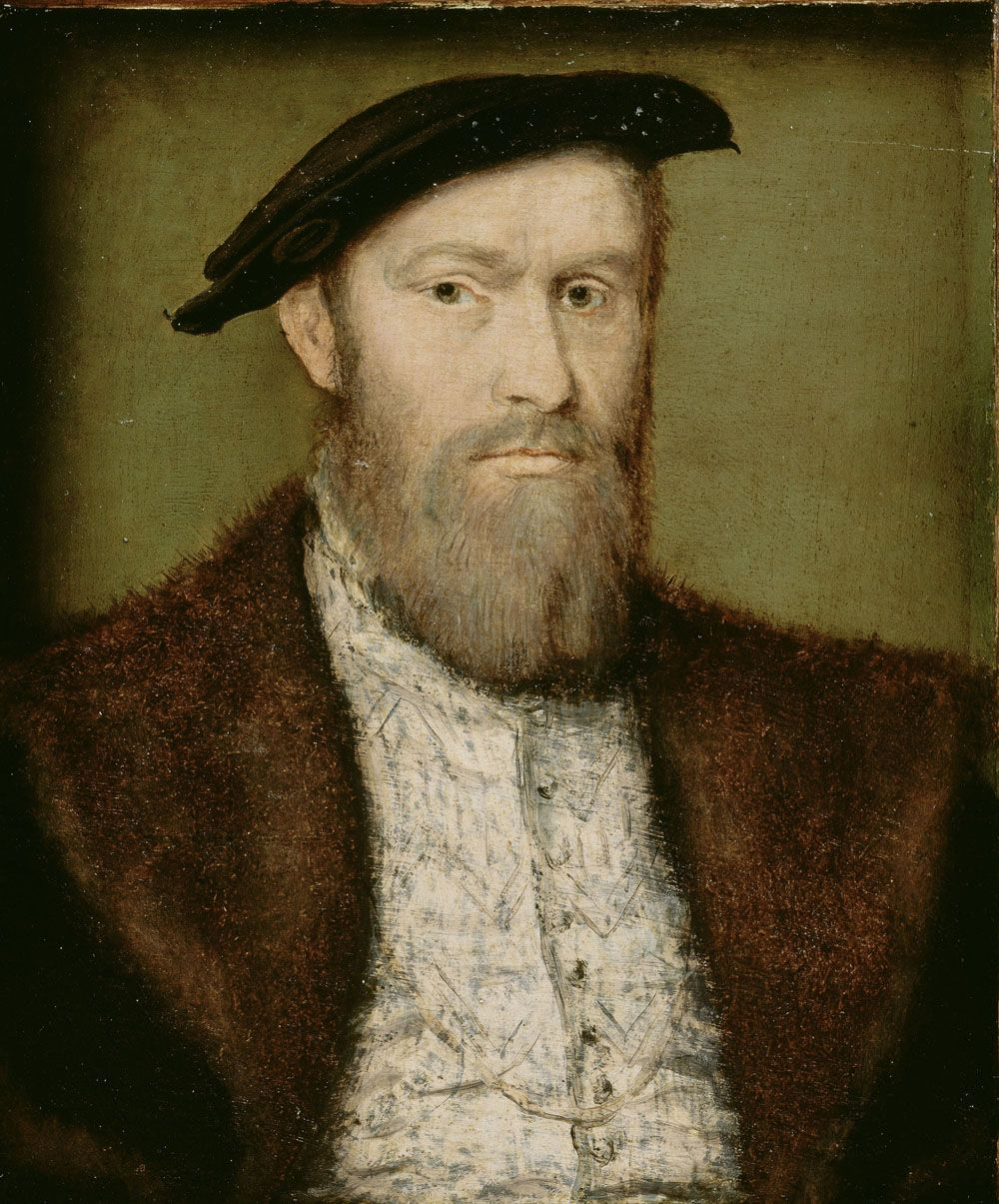
Amiral de Chabot, the royal favourite to whom Saint-Pol was aligned

The amiral de Chabot was disgraced on 8 February 1540. Saint-Pol went to console him alongside the duc d'Orléans, the maréchal d'Annebault and the king of Navarre. Saint-Pol would make pleas on his behalf with the king during this period of his disgrace.

On 22 May 1540, a key meeting of the conseil secret was undertaken, at which the proposal for a marriage between the king's second surviving son (i.e. his third eldest) the duc d'Orléans and a Spanish infanta (princess) was discussed. By the terms of this marriage, Milan would have fallen to Orléans, in return for the French surrendering their hold over Savoy and Piedmont back to the duca di Savoia. Alongside the king and Saint-Pol at this meeting were the dauphin (the duc d'Orléans until 1536), the cardinal de Lorraine, the connétable de Montmorency, the cardinal de Tournon the chancellor Poyet, the maréchal d'Annebault and Villandry.

By October 1540, the connétable de Montmorency's star was rapidly falling. With his disgrace, the question arose as to who would succeed him in the royal favour: Saint-Pol was one of the candidates. However, Saint-Pol worked to see to the rehabilitation of the amiral de Chabot, alongside the duchesse d'Étampes, the cardinaux de Givry and de Meudon, and the maréchal d'Annebault.

Despite the efforts of Saint-Pol, the duchesse d'Étampes and the others, the chancellor Poyet would see Chabot's trial reach a conviction on 8 February 1541. The amiral was to pay a fine of 700,500 francs, be stripped of all his honours and officers and live under arrest in the château de Vincennes. It was reported in a Venetian correspondence that François had not wanted the destruction of his childhood friend to go so far. Shortly after the amiral's judgement was handed down, the amiral received a visit in his new prison from Saint-Pol, the king of Navarre, the maréchal d'Annebault and the duc d'Orléans to offer their comforts.

Also during February, the duchesse d'Étampes, Chabot's strongest ally, saw her sister married to Chabot's nephew the seigneur de Jarnac. Poyet found himself subject to significant hatred from much of the great nobility. At this time Saint-Pol, along with Annebault and Tournon were all men in the faction of the duchesse d'Étampes.

=== Return of Chabot ===
Annebault and Saint-Pol both besieged François with requests of mercy in Chabot's favour. Meanwhile, the duchesse d'Étampes prepared a scene to break her lovers resolve: on 13 February the king entered into her chambers where he was beseeched by Chabot's wife Françoise de Longwy who threw herself at his feet begging for mercy for her husband. This was taken up by all the other ladies present, and François was moved by the display, urging the ladies to have confidence. He then left and was met by Chabot's daughter who made the same plea. François was now convinced to oppose Poyet as did many of his favourites.

On 1 March, the royal council, comprising Saint-Pol, Annebault, Saint-André, the king and his two sons the cardinaux du Bellay and de Ferrara, and the chancellor Poyet voided the conviction of amiral de Chabot.

On 10 March, the king wrote a favourable letter to Chabot, declaring his affection for the disgraced amiral and noting that he would restore him to his property and offices. Poyet was shocked by the king's resolution, taken without his involvement. It would now be the chancellor who was subject to a several month investigation, and though maintaining his office, he found that he enjoyed no credit without the disgraced connétable's protection.

Keen to avoid seeing his enemy Chabot triumphant, Montmorency retired to Bretagne. On 29 March Chabot was declared innocent by the same group of councillors (including Saint-Pol). For the damages to Chabot's honour, he was to receive 200,000 francs. Though he was now free to participate in council again, it was by no means clear he would return to the position of pre-eminence he had previously enjoyed.

Montmorency was obliged to announce his own disgrace to his associates when the king resolved to have all dispatches from Italy sent to the maréchal d'Annebault in May 1541. Montmorency thus counselled his followers to adhere to François' wishes in this regard. At this time, the council lacked a single dominant figure, composed of the cardinaux de Lorraine and de Tournon, the comte de Saint-Pol, the chancellor Poyet, and the maréchal d'Annebault. François was unsatisfied with this multipolar state of affairs, and looked to have Chabot re-assume his pre-eminence.

At the wedding of Jeanne d'Albret (future queen of Navarre) to the herzog von Cleves (duke of Cleves) on 14 June 1541, the connétable de Montmorency was humiliated, being ordered by the king to carry the young princess up to the altar after she refused to move on her own accord, something he did while the rest of the court watched. Feeling defeated, Montmorency refused to attend a ball that evening, and then departed the next day without royal leave, never to return to court during François' lifetime. At the masked ball were to be found Saint-Pol, Annebault, the cardinal de Lorraine and the king, all in sumptuous dress. These men participated in a dance.

Ambassadors who bore witness to the humiliation of Montmorency began to speculate on who might succeed him in controlling the affairs of the kingdom, with the names of Saint-Pol, Tournon, Annebault, the chancellor Poyet and the duchesse d'Étampes all floated. François' favourites had until this time always been nobles d'épée and therefore Saint Pol and Annebault were the only plausible candidates, with Saint-Pol of a more advantageous birth. Nevertheless, the memory of the treason of the connétable de Bourbon still lingered on the princes house. Rather than choose a singular successor he first renewed his advisors. In the end it would be the amiral de Chabot, recalled shortly before Montmorency's final disgrace, who assumed the leadership of the royal council.

The amiral, dominant once more, confirmed all the other members of the council in their positions (with the exception of Poyet, who had played such a role in his conviction, whom he side-lined. Chabot showered Saint-Pol with requests after his restoration in the royal favour.

Alongside the king, the amiral de Chabot, and the maréchal d'Annebault, Saint-Pol was involved in a mock attack on a grove held by the soldiers of the king's son the dauphin and the duc d'Orléans in June 1541 as part of a festival.

On 2 August 1541, Saint-Pol was described by the seigneur de Matignon as being the head of the conseil secret. Chabot's health was by this point failing, and in combination with the king's desire to avoid a repeat of the pre-eminence Montmorency had enjoyed at his peak, this caused the royal council to enjoy a more collegiate atmosphere, with responsibility shared between Chabot, Annebault, Saint-Pol and Tournon.

It was reported to the duca di Ferrara (duke of Ferrara) in February 1542 that for the carnival the king had his sons (the dauphin and the duc d'Orléans) run with lances against himself, the comte de Saint-Pol, the amiral de Chabot, the maréchal d'Annebault and a certain Jean de Canaples. The king's favourites were dressed for the occasion with the greatest ostentation in the same colours as the king.

=== Saint-Pol's last war ===
Under the direction of Annebault, Saint-Pol would assist in the preparations for the defence of Picardie in 1542. The former raised 6,000 additional foot soldiers to this end.

On 23 May 1542, the king decided to both redistribute the key provincial governorships and reconfirm those who held the charges. Thus, the king of Navarre was established as governor and lieutenant-général of Guyenne, the amiral de Chabot was reaffirmed in his charge as governor of Bourgogne, the duc de Vendôme (Saint-Pol's nephew) as governor of Picardie, Saint-Pol himself over the province of Dauphiné and Guise over Champagne and Brie. Further the maréchal d'Annebault was reaffirmed over French held Piedmont. Concurrent to this, the king was rearming the kingdom and the légions fanned out over the kingdom, with the compagnies joining with their captains on the borders.

Disillusioned with the diplomatic policy Montmorency had led during his ascendency, François looked to best the Emperor by means of war once again. When he received word from his ambassador to the Ottoman Empire, the baron de La Garde bearing promises of support, he acted. On 12 July, he declared war, listing his various grievances with the Emperor, among which were murder of two French ambassadors.

An army nominally under the command of his youngest son, the duc d'Orléans invaded Luxembourg; meanwhile his eldest son led a much larger won to lay siege to Perpignan on the southern frontier with Spain.

The amiral de Chabot and Saint-Pol were sent to see the French siege of Perpignan in September 1542 so that they might inform the king what the army could achieve. They reported back to the sovereign that while the siege had started with great promise in August, the prospect of its success was by now non existent. With the city able to hold its own against a diminishing army, there was no prospect of the Emperor coming to its defence. François' plan of revenge was thus scuppered.

On 20 February 1543, the king summoned all advisers to participate in a council for the 'sake of his finances'. Saint-Pol was not however called to participate in this meeting. Nawrocki speculates Saint-Pol's absence may have been a product of the fact he lacked competence in fiscal matters. Alongside other otherwise important advisers to the king like the duc de Guise he was permitted to attend the financial council when a request was being made.

=== Lieutenant-général de Normandie ===
Upon the death of the amiral de Chabot, which occurred on 1 June 1543, Saint-Pol became the lieutenant-général de Normandie. He would not hold this charge for long however, being relieved of it in favour of the maréchal d'Annebault on 6 December of the same year. As had Saint-Pol, the maréchal held the charge under the nominal purview of the dauphin while de facto exercising the power of governor. During his brief tenure in 1543, Saint-Pol was involved in a dispute in his government of Normandie concerning the appointment of the seigneur de Matignon as his lieutenant. The registration of this appointment by the parlement was opposed by the premier président of the parlement of Rouen who convinced the avocat général to join him in this campaign. In September, Saint-Pol wrote to his lieutenant, characterising the efforts against him as the work of a Montmorency aligned cabal. With the death of the premier président on 8 December, this crisis was resolved. The reason for Saint-Pol's dismissal from Normandie is unknown, Nawrocki suggests that it might either be due to a failure of Saint-Pol to act satisfactorily in the post, or a product of his troubled health causing him to request relief of the charge. The post of amiral would lie vacant for a while, and there were rumours the king intended to divide the office across the governors of Normandie, Bretagne and Languedoc. Instead, it would be given to Annebault, and letters of provision to this effect were provided on 5 February 1544. It would be Annebault, rather than Saint-Pol or Tournon who filled the position of pre-eminence in the royal council vacated by Chabot. Nawrocki highlights that Saint-Pol's role with the king was primarily a military one, and he had little involvement in diplomatic or fiscal matters. Further, as a prince du sang there was possibly reason for hesitancy from François, given the treason of his cousin the duc de Bourbon. It would only be in November 1543, that Annebault's triumph and dominance became truly visible at court however, due to the preoccupations of campaign prior to that point.

=== Northern campaign ===
The maréchal d'Annebault was tasked by François with leading an army in support of the French ally, the herzog von Cleves, who was being attacked by the Emperor. He left the king on 10 June to fulfil this mission arriving first at Soissons and then Montcornet where he made his camp. Annebault commanded the left part of the vanguard which comprised the Italian bands, parts of the gendarmerie and the light horse; Saint-Pol commanded the right of the vanguard with the landsknechts and two hundred gentleman of the king's household. In the battle was to be found the maréchal du Biez on the left, and the dauphin on the right commanding the men-at-arms and the Swiss; finally the rear-guard was commanded by the duc de Guise with the soldiers of the arrière-ban (the king's vassals summoned to render their military service) and the young duc de Vendôme with the légionnaires of Picardie. Annebault commanded a part of this force to split off for Avesnes-sur-Helpe, before reconsidering and calling this force back even though the seigneur de Langey thought the place eminently takeable. Nawrocki finds the most likely reason for this re-evaluation by Annebault to be the king's prioritisation of the capture of Landrecies, which was held to be the key to Hainaut and Artois.

After allowing the soldiers of the garrison of Landrecies to flee, the key town was taken by Annebault's army without a fight.

The Imperial commander the graaf van Rœulx (count of Rœulx) fancied that he might recapture Landrecies and stationed his soldiers in the Forêt de Mormal (forest of Mormal). Several French commanders of note (among whom were the duc d'Aumale - son of the duc de Guise- and the seigneur d'Andelot - the nephew of the connétable de Montmorency) brought him to skirmish. François was frustrated at this independent action and ordered his captains to join with him for the march on Luxembourg. By 5 August, François' army was at Folembray. The young duc de Vendôme (nephew of Saint-Pol) was to maintain Landrecies in the absence of the various captains François had summoned to him. By mid-August, the royal army was at Stenay and then Sainte-Menehould. Annebault captured without a fight Arlon and Virton which commanded the approaches to Luxembourg, before laying siege to the city on 10 September. Cannons were established with the hope of quickly bringing the city to terms before reinforcements could arrive. The Imperial party was keen to negotiate, and by the next day the city had surrendered. François was now in position of the capital of the duché de Luxembourg. While Saint-Pol and the cardinal de Tournon called for Luxembourg's destruction as the price of the cities betrayal, and Annebault called for the dismantling of its walls so the more defensible Arlon might be reinforced, he rebuffed them, arguing that the city was his inheritance and he was now the duc de Luxembourg.

From June to July 1543, with the king on campaign in the northern frontier, the royal council had been divided into two, with the conseil privé remaining in Paris under the auspices of the cardinal de Tournon to deal with ordinary business. Meanwhile, a narrow council that handled the primarily military decisions followed François on campaign. These two wings of the council were unified in August with the garde des sceaux (guard of the privy seals, de facto chancellor) François Errault, Tournon and the comte de Saint-Pol (who had returned from Annebault's army) comprising the body. Thus, when the sieur de Langey visited the royal camp in September to seek advice, he found the king surrounded by Tournon and Saint-Pol, who Langey described as being in charge of matters in the absence of Annebault.

In September 1543, both England and the Emperor jointly declared war on France. The Emperor had avoided declaring war in response to François' declaration of the previous year, as he had wished to assure himself of allies first before delivering his response.

Quite contrary to the ambitions of Saint-Pol, Luxembourg was to be fortified, and also, as the Imperial army was rumoured to be moving west after defeating François' ally the herzog von Jülich-Cleves-Berg (duke of Jülich-Cleves-Berg), keep the city well supplied. François entered his new city on 28 September, celebrating the ceremony of the ordre de Saint-Michel the next day. Word now reached Luxembourg that the Imperial efforts against Landrecies had been well reinforced, and that the Emperor himself might join with his army. Thus, the king departed for Landrecies on 2 October, leaving the seigneur de Longueval as governor of the conquered territory, with 800 men-at-arms.

The rumours of the Emperors arrival proved true, and he had established himself at Quesnoy-le-Comte between Guise and Landrecies on 19 October. From here he waited for more reinforcements for his army.

As François' army made its noisy approach, the Imperial commander Gonzaga withdrew from the walls of Landrecies. In his withdrawal he was pursued by the comte de Brissac. In the skirmish that followed between the two forces, the marchese di Massa Lombarda (marquis of Massa Lombarda), commander of the Imperial light cavalry and brother to the duca di Ferrara (duke of Ferrara) was captured. In the French army, discipline was not particularly strong, particularly among the légionnaires who deserted for lack of pay.

Around this time, a food crisis was developing in the newly conquered Luxembourg, despite its requisitioning of supplies from other parts of France. The Emperor hoped to starve out Landrecies before François could bring his whole army to bear. He assessed that the city was overflowing with men-at-arms which made an assault impossible but also left the city vulnerable in terms of victuals. His assessment was correct, and on 18 October one of the defenders, the seigneur d'Yville travelled to François to explain the desperate situation. The king reassured him that he would be there soon. By 28 October he had arrived at Saint-Souplet, where he was able to see the Emperors batteries around Landrecies. That night, he declared his presence to the Emperor by firing off his artillery into the Imperial camp. Saint-Pol, Annebault and du Biez were tasked with scouting out a place on the banks of the Sambre, before François established himself there, opposite the enemy.

In the coming days, the Emperor gathered parts of his army from in front of Landrecies, to face off against the French army. This was an opportunity that the comte de Saint-Pol and maréchal d'Annebault seized to bring in supplies into Landrecies and replace the weary men in the defence of the place, which they successfully accomplished on 30 October. As a reward for the endurance and bravery of the three principal captains of the place who were to be relieved of their responsibilities, François made them gentilhomme de la chambre or maîtres d'hôtel (positions in his household). A second resupply was to be carried out by the seigneur de Langey, in less pressing conditions that the first.

On 1 November, the French and Imperial armies were squared up against each other on plateaus, and battle seemed possible. A skirmish would follow, but no full battle. Now that Landrecies had been resupplied, the Emperor's position was untenable, as the countryside was picked clean of food by months of occupations by the soldiery. Meanwhile, François' army enjoyed an unfavourable position, and thus he did not wish to give battle either, and it would be the French who withdrew. Though there would be one more point at which battle could have been given after this, nothing came of it. François withdrew to Guise with Saint-Pol and Annebault commanding the battle of his army (where the dauphin was located) on 4 December. The Emperor meanwhile withdrew to Cambrai. François disbanded much of his forces for the winter. Nawrocki highlights that both sides claimed the other had been humiliated into withdrawal, but that in his impression it was the French who triumphed, through holding Landrecies against a sizeable Imperial force.

Summarising the campaign, Nawrocki finds it was greatly to the credit of the dauphin, Annebault and Saint-Pol. François' position on the Imperial border had been greatly strengthened by the capture of Landrecies, Arlon, and Luxembourg. There was plunder, and valuable prisoners in tow upon the return of the French army also. The only cloud on the horizon was the defeat of the French ally, the herzog von Cleves, whose participation in the conflict had helped France avoid invasion.

=== Ceresole ===
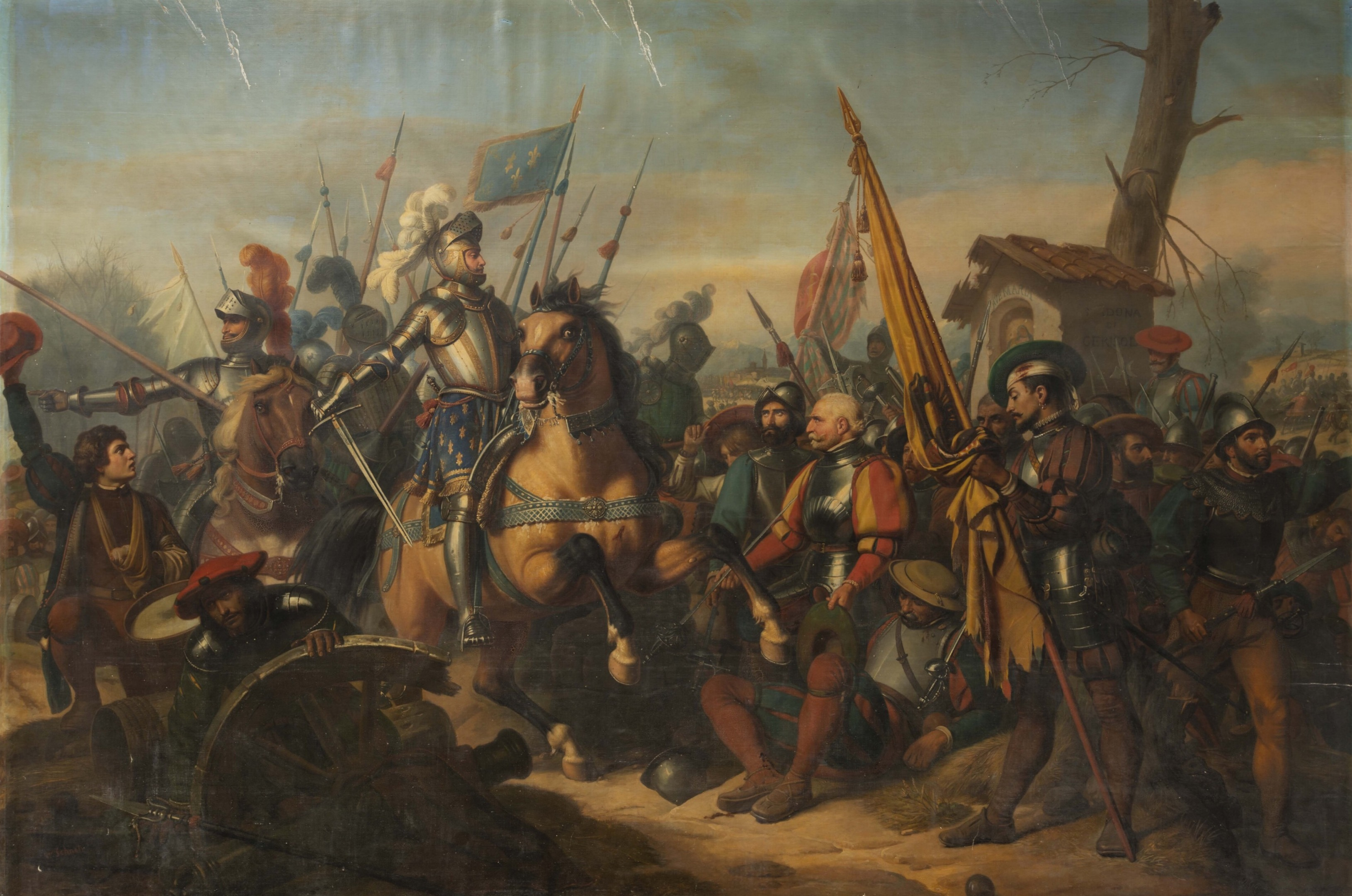
Comte d'Enghien at the battle of Ceresole

François travelled to Paris in February 1544 so he might prepare to meet the coming invasion of the kingdom by the Anglo-Imperial alliance. Meanwhile, in Piedmont, the war had already begun for the year. The comte d'Enghien, who served as the French lieutenant-général of Piedmont had been besieging the settlement of Carignano since January. An Imperial army under the marchese del Vasto (marquis del Vasto) approached his position, aiming to relieve Carignano. Keen to determine whether he might have permission to engage in battle, Enghien dispatched the seigneur de Monluc to court to secure the king's assent.

Monluc provides to us a very animated account of how his meeting with the king and his council transpired in his memoires. Alongside the king were the dauphin, the comte de Saint-Pol, the amiral d'Annebault (who had been invested with the charge that February), the grand écuyer Galiot de Genouillac, the seigneur de Boisy and several other persons. Only the king, Saint-Pol and the amiral d'Annebault were seated for the meeting, while the rest stood. The king opened by explaining to Monluc that he had wanted the latter figure present so that he might explain to Enghien the broader situation in the kingdom prohibited the possibility of battle. The king then turned the floor over to Saint-Pol, who explained a joint Anglo-Imperial invasion was coming within the next six weeks. With the légionnaires inexperienced, it was imperative that the tough soldiers in Piedmont not be potentially thrown away in a lost battle at the kingdom's hour of need. For Saint-Pol, the needs of the state were paramount. This speech was followed by a similar one from Annebault. Monluc's temper was rising but he was cooled by Saint-Pol who restrained him from interrupting the grand écuyer. François then turned to Monluc, asking him if he well understood, and permitting him to speak frankly. Monluc did so, outlining the strength of the forces in Piedmont, stating they were ready to either conquer or die. As Monluc went on, he received expressions of support from the dauphin, who was standing behind the king, and a smile from François. Monluc went on to describe François' martial past, as well as the achievements of the soldiers in recent months. He argued, if they shrunk from battle, the spirit of the soldiers would collapse and the army would fall apart. Saint-Pol appealed to the king and further inflamed Monluc again by saying that a battle was too important a matter to be left to a Gascon and he was supported by others in the room. After some vacillating, the king threw his cap on the table and cried "Qu'ils combattent! Qu'ils combattent!' (Let them fight! Let them fight!)

Laughing, Saint-Pol stated to Monluc that he was a 'raging fool', and that he would either bring the king the 'greatest harm' or the 'greatest good'. Monluc retorted that Saint-Pol should not put any doubt on the outcome of the coming combat. The king meanwhile informed Annebault of the instructions he was to give Enghien, and the forces Monluc was to bring to join with the prince in Piedmont. Thus, according to Monluc, the king had been persuaded away from the cautious policy of Saint-Pol by Monluc's animated passion.

In the battle that followed in April at Ceresole, Enghien won a hard-fought victory, but was not permitted to march on into Milan. The victory was thus without major significance.

As Saint-Pol had prognosticated, a dual invasion of the kingdom soon followed, with Imperial forces crossing the border while an army of Henry VIII's landed in the kingdom. Though the plan had initially been to march on Paris, Henry instead resolved to besiege Boulogne, which fell to his army. The Emperor meanwhile was attempting to reduce Saint-Dizier, the capture of which would have opened the road to Paris. Disputes between his soldiers and a lack of money thus drew the Emperor towards peace, which was signed on 18 September at Crépy.

In this period, Michon characterises Saint-Pol as the third pillar of the council, behind only the cardinal de Tournon and the amiral d'Annebault in strength. With his death in 1545, Tournon and Annebault held the field. His position on the council was not filled by a new figure.

=== Death and legacy ===
With Saint-Pol's death on 1 September 1545, the position of governor of Dauphiné fell vacant. The charge would remain vacant for the next two years, until the new king Henri II installed the duc d'Aumale in the office on 14 May 1547. Harding records by contrast that Saint-Pol's nine-year-old son held the charge from 1545 until his death in 1546.

Potter has it that in July 1545, the comté de Saint-Pol was awarded to the deceased Saint-Pol's children who were to hold the territory under Imperial suzerainty. There was to be a bill of 200,000 livres for damages caused to the comté during the French king's stewardship of the territory, royal agents would seek to minimise these charges. The idea that Saint-Pol was dead by July 1545 is supported by Nawrocki, who states that Saint-Pol died in September 1544, as opposed to September 1545.

Unlike his elder brother Vendôme, Saint-Pol would enjoy the status of royal favourite throughout his life. Michon nevertheless notes, that because Saint-Pol did not play a technical role in the king's administration, as had the comte de Tende who acted fiscally in the royal council, he was always to be a secondary figure. Michon does note that the trio of brothers possessed a useful advantage of numbers, over their competitors for royal favour such as the Lorraines (two brothers) and other favourites who either had no brothers or if they did they were of a fundamentally secondary nature (as with the connétable de Montmorency).

== Notes ==
^α Le Fur reports that Saint-Pol was in Asti in June, however this is not possible, as late as 13 July the prince was writing to the king from Grenoble, having yet to cross the Alps.

== Sources ==
- Boltanski, Ariane (2006). Les ducs de Nevers et l'État royal: genèse d'un compromis (ca 1550 - ca 1600). Librairie Droz.
- Carouge, Pierre (1999). L'Amiral de Bonnivet et sa Famille (vers 1450 - vers 1525). École Nationale des Chartes.
- Chatenet, Monique (2011). "Annexe II: Les lieux du conseil". In Michon, Cédric (ed.). Les Conseillers de François Ier. Presses Universitaires de Rennes.
- Cloulas, Ivan (1985). Henri II. Fayard.
- Cooper, Richard (2013). "Poésies Inédites de Jean Du Bellay". In Michon, Cédric; Petris, Loris (eds.). Le Cardinal Jean du Bellay: Diplomatie et Culture dans l'Europe de la Renaissance. Presses Universitaires de Rennes; Presses Universitaires François-Rabelais.
- Crouzet, Denis (2003). Charles de Bourbon: Connétable de France. Fayard.
- Crouzet, Denis (2015). "Préface". L'Amiral Claude d'Annebault: conseiller favori de François Ier. Classiques Garnier.
- Duc, Séverin (2019). La Guerre de Milan: Conquérir, Gouverner, Résister dans l'Europe de la Renaissance. Champ Vallon.
- Durot, Éric (2012). François de Lorraine, duc de Guise entre Dieu et le Roi. Classiques Garnier. ISBN 9782812406102.
- Guinand, Julien (2020). La Guerre du Roi aux Portes de l'Italie: 1515-1559. Presses Universitaires de Rennes.
- Hamon, Philippe (1999). "Messieurs des Finances": Les Grands Officiers de Finance dans la France de la Renaissance. Comité pour l'Histoire Économique et Financière de la France.
- Harding, Robert (1978). Anatomy of a Power Elite: the Provincial Governors in Early Modern France. Yale University Press.
- Jacquart, Jean (1994). François Ier. Fayard.
- Knecht, Robert (1994). Renaissance Warrior and Patron: The Reign of Francis I. Cambridge University Press.
- Knecht, Robert (1996). The Rise and Fall of Renaissance France. Fontana Press.
- Knecht, Robert (2008). The French Renaissance Court. Yale University Press.
- Knecht, Robert (2011a). "Philippe Chabot de Brion (v. 1492-1543)". In Michon, Cédric (ed.). Les Conseillers de François Ier. Presses Universitaires de Rennes.
- Le Fur, Didier (2018). François Ier. Perrin.
- Le Roux, Nicolas (2015). Le Crépuscule de la Chevalerie: Noblesse et Guerre au Siècle de la Renaissance. Champ Vallon.
- Michon, Cédric (2011a). "Conseils et Conseillers sous François Ier". In Michon, Cédric (ed.). Les Conseillers de François Ier. Presses Universitaires de Rennes.
- Michon, Cédric (2011b). "Odet de Foix, vicomte de Lautrec (v. 1483-1528)". In Michon, Cédric (ed.). Les Conseillers de François Ier. Presses Universitaires de Rennes.
- Michon, Cédric (2011c). "Jean de Lorraine (1498-1550)". In Michon, Cédric (ed.). Les Conseillers de François Ier. Presses Universitaires de Rennes.
- Michon, Cédric (2011d). "Les Frères de Bourbon-Vendôme: Charles, duc de Bourbon-Vendôme (1489-1537); François, comte de Saint-Pol (1491-1545); Louis cardinal de Bourbon (1493-1557)". In Michon, Cédric (ed.). Les Conseillers de François Ier. Presses Universitaires de Rennes.
- Michon, Cédric (2011e). "Hippolyte d'Este (1509-1572)". In Michon, Cédric (ed.). Les Conseillers de François Ier. Presses Universitaires de Rennes.
- Michon, Cédric (2018). François Ier: Un Roi Entre Deux Mondes. Belin.
- Nawrocki, François (2011). "Claude d'Annebault (v. 1495-1552)". In Michon, Cédric (ed.). Les Conseillers de François Ier. Presses Universitaires de Rennes.
- Nawrocki, François (2011b). "Le Dauphin Henri (1519-1559)". In Michon, Cédric (ed.). Les Conseillers de François Ier. Presses Universitaires de Rennes.
- Nawrocki, François (2015). L'Amiral Claude d'Annebault: conseiller favori de François Ier. Classiques Garnier.
- Neuschel, Kristen (1989). Word of Honor: Interpreting Noble Culture in Sixteenth-Century France. Cornell University Press.
- Potter, David (1992). "The Luxembourg Inheritance: The House of Bourbon and its lands in Northern France during the Sixteenth Century". French History. 6 (1): 24–62. doi:10.1093/fh/6.1.24.
- Potter, David (1993). War and Government in the French Provinces: Picardy 1470-1560. Cambridge University Press.
- Potter, David (1995). A History of France 1460-1560: The Emergence of a Nation State. Macmillan.
- Potter, David (2011). "Anne de Pisseleu (1508-1580), duchesse d'Étampes, maîtresse et conseillère de François Ier". In Michon, Cédric (ed.). Les Conseillers de François Ier. Presses Universitaires de Rennes.
- Rentet, Thierry (2011). Anne de Montmorency: Grand Maître de François Ier. Presses Universitaires de Rennes.
- Rentet, Thierry (2011b). "Anne de Montmorency (1493-1567): Le Conseiller Médiocre". In Michon, Cédric (ed.). Les Conseillers de François Ier. Presses Universitaires de Rennes.
- Rentet, Thierry (2011c). "Guillaume Bochetel (?-1558)". In Michon, Cédric (ed.). Les Conseillers de François Ier. Presses Universitaires de Rennes.
- Rentet, Thierry; Michon, Cédric (2011). "Annexe I: Présences annuelles au Conseil (1515-1547)". In Michon, Cédric (ed.). Les Conseillers de François Ier. Presses Universitaires de Rennes.
- Rodríguez Salgado, Maria José (2018). "A Masterclass in Justification: Francis I, Charles V and Pope Paul III in the 1540s". In Amico, Juan Carlos d'; Fournel, Jean-Louis (eds.). François Ier et l'Espace Politique Italien: États, Domaines et Territoires.
- Sainte-Marie, Anselme de (1733). Histoire généalogique et chronologique de la maison royale de France, des pairs, grands officiers de la Couronne, de la Maison du Roy et des anciens barons du royaume: Tome I. La compagnie des libraires.
- Shaw, Christine (2019). The Italian Wars 1494-1559: War, State and Society in Early Modern Europe. Routledge.
- Sournia, Jean-Charles (1981). Blaise de Monluc: Soldat et Écrivain (1500-1577). Fayard.
- Vellet, Christophe (2011). "Entre Légistes et Ministres: Antoine Duprat (1463-1535), Conseiller Technicien de François Ier". In Michon, Cédric (ed.). Les Conseillers de François Ier. Presses Universitaires de Rennes.
- Vissière, Laurent (2011). "Louis II de La Trémoille (1460-1525): Au Service de François Ier". In Michon, Cédric (ed.). Les Conseillers de François Ier. Presses Universitaires de Rennes.
