= Bosc-Roger-sur-Buchy =

- Part of Buchy
- Location of Bosc-Roger-sur-Buchy
- Location within France Location within Normandy
- Coordinates: 49°34′59″N 1°23′21″E
- Country: France
- Region: Normandy
- Department: Seine-Maritime
- Arrondissement: Rouen
- Canton: Le Mesnil-Esnard
- Commune: Buchy
- Area^{1}: 14.17 km^{2} (5.47 sq mi)
- Elevation: 204 m (669 ft)
- Highest elevation: 231 m (758 ft)
- Lowest elevation: 139 m (456 ft)
- Population (2023): 714
  - Density: 50.4/km^{2} (131/sq mi)
- Time zone: UTC+01:00 (CET)
  - Summer (DST): UTC+02:00 (CEST)
- Postal code: 76750
- ^{1} French Land Register data, which excludes lakes, ponds, glaciers > 1 km^{2} (0.386 sq mi or 247 acres) and river estuaries.

Bosc-Roger-sur-Buchy is a former commune in the Seine-Maritime department in the Normandy region in northern France. On 1 January 2017, it was merged into the commune Buchy.

The inhabitants of the town of Bosc-Roger-sur-Buchy are called Rogélois, Rogéloises in French.

== Geography ==
A farming village situated in the Pays de Bray, some 18 miles (29 km) northeast of Rouen at the junction of the D919 and the D96 roads.

== Places of interest ==
- The church of Notre-Dame, dating from the sixteenth century.

== See also ==
- Communes of the Seine-Maritime department
