= Buchy, Seine-Maritime =

Buchy
- Commune
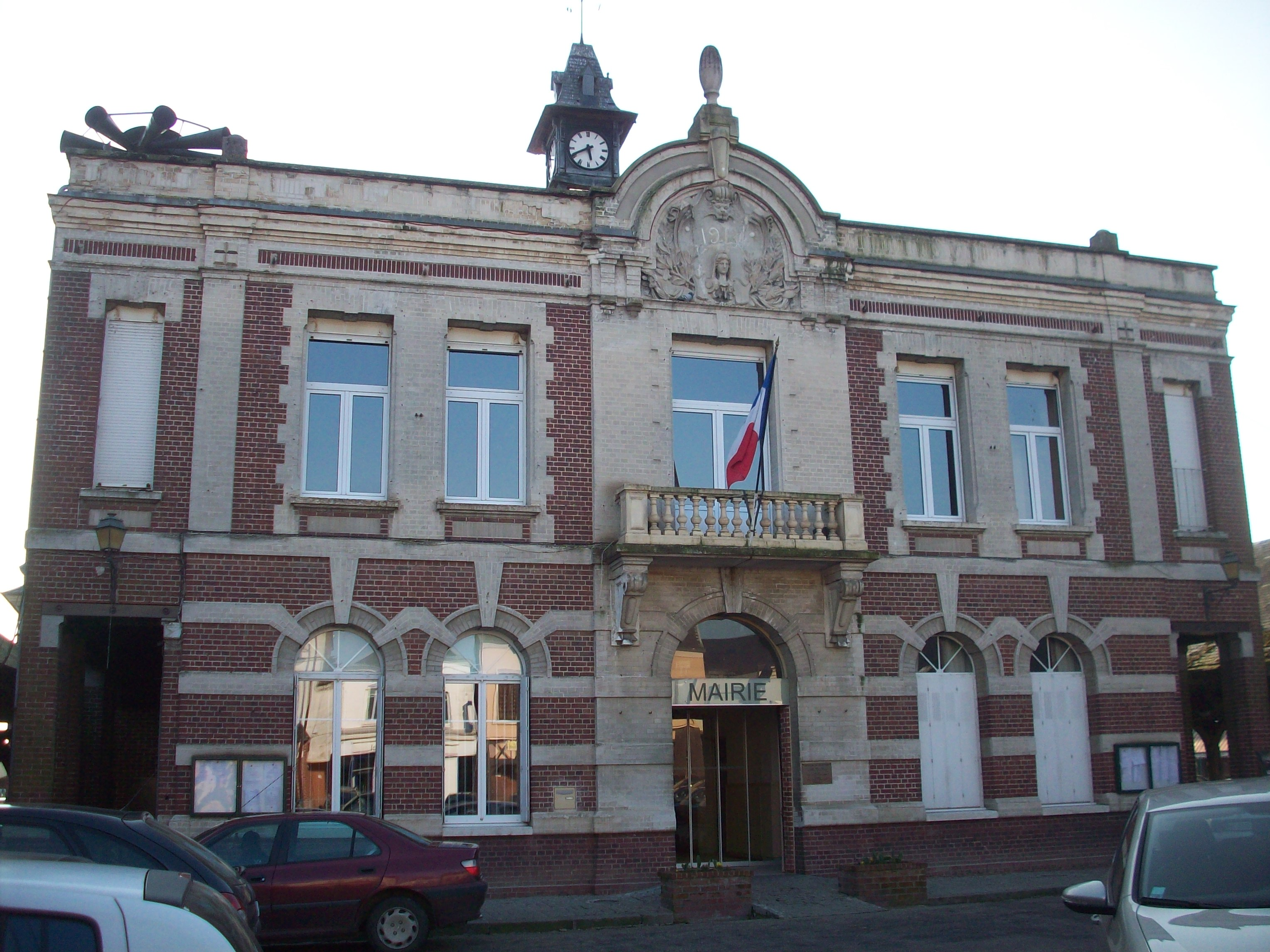
- The town hall in Buchy

- Coat of arms
- Location of Buchy
- Location within France Location within Normandy
- Coordinates: 49°35′10″N 1°21′37″E
- Country: France
- Region: Normandy
- Department: Seine-Maritime
- Arrondissement: Rouen
- Canton: Le Mesnil-Esnard
- Intercommunality: Inter-Caux-Vexin

Government
  - Mayor (2026–32): Joël Lefebvre
- Area^{1}: 26.30 km^{2} (10.15 sq mi)
- Elevation: 192 m (630 ft)
- Highest elevation: 231 m (758 ft)
- Lowest elevation: 139 m (456 ft)
- Population (2023): 2,815
  - Density: 107.0/km^{2} (277.2/sq mi)
- Time zone: UTC+01:00 (CET)
  - Summer (DST): UTC+02:00 (CEST)
- INSEE/Postal code: 76146 /76750
- ^{1} French Land Register data, which excludes lakes, ponds, glaciers > 1 km^{2} (0.386 sq mi or 247 acres) and river estuaries.

Buchy (French pronunciation: [byʃi]) is a commune in the Seine-Maritime department in the Normandy region in northern France. On 1 January 2017, the former communes of Bosc-Roger-sur-Buchy and Estouteville-Écalles were merged into Buchy.

The inhabitants of the town of Buchy are called Buchois, Buchoises in French.

== Geography ==
A small farming town situated in the Pays de Bray some 16 miles (26 km) northeast of Rouen, at the junction of the D7, D41 and the D919 roads. Montérolier-Buchy station has rail connections to Rouen, Lille and Amiens.

== Heraldry ==
Arms of Buchy	The arms of Buchy are blazoned : Azure, an ax argent, handled Or, planted in a stump proper, on a chief gules, 3 logger's wedges argent.

== Population ==
Historical population
Year	Pop.	±% p.a.
1968	1,746	—
1975	1,842	+0.77%
1982	1,886	+0.34%
1990	1,984	+0.64%
1999	2,174	+1.02%
2007	2,581	+2.17%
2012	2,635	+0.41%
2017	2,757	+0.91%
2023	2,815	+0.35%
Populations of the area corresponding with the commune of Buchy at 1 January 2025. Source: INSEE

== Places of interest ==
- The church of Sts. Peter & Paul, dating from the sixteenth century.
- An eleventh-century feudal motte.
- The seventeenth-century market hall.

== See also ==
- Communes of the Seine-Maritime department
