= Duke of Estouteville =

Title in the French nobility

Coat of arms of Francois de Bourbon, Duke of Estouteville

Duke of Estouteville (duc d'Estouteville) was a title in the French nobility that is claimed today by the Prince of Monaco.

It was created in 1537 by King Francis I of France for Adrienne d'Estouteville (1512–1560) and her husband François de Bourbon, Count of Saint-Pol (1491–1545) (who was son of Francis, Count of Vendôme and his wife Marie of Luxembourg, Countess of Vendôme). The title passed briefly to their young son Francis II (1536/'37-1546), then to their daughter Marie (1539–1601), who married successively her first cousin Jean de Bourbon, Count of Soissons (1528–1557); François de Clèves, Duke of Nevers (1539–1563); and Léonor d'Orléans, duc de Longueville (1540–1573). The dukedom passed to the descendants of Marie's third marriage, the dukes of Longueville, the last male of whom died in 1694, leaving a childless sister and remote cousins descended through females.

Estouteville was inherited by the last duke's sister, Marie d'Orleans-Longueville, Duchess de Nemours (1625–1707) whose closest relatives were remote cousins descended through daughters of the Longueville. After her death Estouteville was inherited, because of the principle of proximity of blood, by the family of Goyon de Matignon, who were descended from Éléonore, youngest daughter of Léonor de Longueville and Marie d'Estouteville. Primogeniture heir would have been the Duchess of Retz, but she was one step further genealogically even if she descended from Éléonore's older sister. Éléonore's descendant Jacques François Léonor Goyon de Matignon (1689–1751), count of Thorigny and lord of the duchy of Estouteville, married in 1715 Louise Hippolyte, heiress-presumptive to the Principality of Monaco, and adopted the name Grimaldi.

The claim to Estouteville was inherited by their descendants, the Princes of Monaco, until their legitimate line became extinct on the death of Prince Louis II in 1949. However, along with the other titles associated with the Monegasque crown, it was assumed by subsequent Princes of Monaco (descended from Louis II's legitimated daughter Charlotte) and is borne today by Albert II, Prince of Monaco. The legitimate succession of Estouteville passed in theory to the Urach descendants of Florestine of Monaco, and is currently held by Patrick Guinness.
