= Estouteville-Écalles =

- Part of Buchy
- Location of Estouteville-Écalles
- Location within France Location within Normandy
- Coordinates: 49°35′31″N 1°19′12″E
- Country: France
- Region: Normandy
- Department: Seine-Maritime
- Arrondissement: Rouen
- Canton: Le Mesnil-Esnard
- Commune: Buchy
- Area^{1}: 8.46 km^{2} (3.27 sq mi)
- Elevation: 180 m (590 ft)
- Highest elevation: 199 m (653 ft)
- Lowest elevation: 159 m (522 ft)
- Population (2023): 479
  - Density: 56.6/km^{2} (147/sq mi)
- Time zone: UTC+01:00 (CET)
  - Summer (DST): UTC+02:00 (CEST)
- Postal code: 76750
- ^{1} French Land Register data, which excludes lakes, ponds, glaciers > 1 km^{2} (0.386 sq mi or 247 acres) and river estuaries.

Estouteville-Écalles is a former commune in the Seine-Maritime department in the region of Normandy, France. On 1 January 2017, it was merged into the commune Buchy.

== Geography ==
A farming village situated in the Pays de Caux, some 14 miles (23 km) northeast of Rouen, at the junction of the D98 and the D919 roads.

== Places of interest ==
- Three churches, in the three parts of the commune, dating from the seventeenth century.
- Evidence of a mediaeval fortress.

== See also ==
- Communes of the Seine-Maritime department
- Duke of Estouteville
