= Toric =

Toric may refer to:

== Mathematics ==
- relating to a torus
  - Toric code
  - Toric hyperkahler manifold
  - Toric ideal
  - Toric joint
  - Toric manifold
  - Toric orbifold
  - Toric section
  - Toric stack
  - Toric variety

== Other uses ==
- Toric lens, a type of optical lens
- Torić, a village in Bosnia and Herzegovina

== See also ==
- Thoric, related to, or containing thorium
