= Basis =

A basis in mathematics, finance, science, and other contexts is a foundational concept or valuation measure. It can also be part of an organization's name. Specific meanings include:

== Finance and accounting ==
- Adjusted basis, the net cost of an asset after adjusting for various tax-related items
- Basis point, 0.01%, often used in the context of interest rates
- Basis swap, an interest rate swap
- Cost basis, in income tax law, the original cost of property adjusted for factors such as depreciation
- Tax basis, cost of an asset

== Securities markets and trading strategies ==
- Basis trading, a trading strategy consisting of the purchase of a security and the sale of a similar security
1. Fixed income markets:
  - Treasury basis trade, a leveraged arbitrage strategy exploiting price differences between Treasury securities and futures contracts
  - Index arbitrage, a strategy that exploits price differences between a stock index and its futures contract
2. Commodities and physical assets:
  - Commodity basis trade (Futures contract, Commodity market), a hedging or arbitrage strategy involving spot and futures prices in commodity markets
3. Equities and funds, including ETFs:
  - Equity basis trade (Merger arbitrage and ETF arbitrage → Exchange-traded fund § Arbitrage mechanism), including arbitrage between ETFs and NAVs or spreads in merger arbitrage
  - Dividend arbitrage (Dividend stripping), a tax optimization strategy involving dividend-paying equities
4. Derivatives and synthetics:
  - Options basis trade (Box spread, Options arbitrage § Conversion, Put–call parity), strategies involving synthetic positions like box spreads or conversions
  - Synthetic tax arbitrage, historical securities lending strategies used by funds to capture or simulate tax benefits
5. Digital assets:
  - Crypto basis trade, a trading strategy using price differentials between spot and futures in digital assets
6. Controversial schemes:
  - CumEx trading (CumEx-Files), a controversial tax arbitrage strategy involving dividend withholding refunds in Europe
7. Pricing concepts:
  - Basis of futures, the value differential between a future and the spot price
  - Basis (options), the value differential between a call option and a put option

== Mathematics and technology ==
- Basis function
- Basis (linear algebra)
  - Dual basis
  - Orthonormal basis
  - Schauder basis
- Basis (universal algebra)
- Basis of a matroid
- Generating set of an ideal:
  - Gröbner basis
  - Hilbert's basis theorem
- Generating set of a group
- Base (topology)
- Change of basis
- Greedoid
- Normal basis
- Polynomial basis
- Radial basis function
- Standard basis
- Transcendence basis of a field extension
- Basis database

== Chemistry ==
- Basis (crystal structure), the positions of the atoms inside the unit cell
- Basis set (chemistry)
- Dry basis, an expression of a calculation in which the presence of water is ignored

== Organizations ==
- Bangladesh Association of Software and Information Services
- Basis Educational Group
- Basis Schools, a group of schools in Arizona, Washington, D.C., and Texas
- Basis Technology Corp., a text analytics company

== People ==
- Dimitris Basis, Greek singer
- Liron Basis (born 1974), Israeli footballer

== See also ==
- Base (disambiguation)
- Basic (disambiguation)
- Basis of Union (disambiguation)
- Basis set (disambiguation)
