= Combinatorial mirror symmetry =

A purely combinatorial approach to mirror symmetry was suggested by Victor Batyrev using the polar duality for $d$-dimensional convex polyhedra. The most famous examples of the polar duality provide Platonic solids: e.g., the cube is dual to octahedron, the dodecahedron is dual to icosahedron. There is a natural bijection between the $k$-dimensional faces of a $d$-dimensional convex polyhedron $P$ and $(d-k-1)$-dimensional faces of the dual polyhedron $P^*$ and one has $(P^*)^* = P$. In Batyrev's combinatorial approach to mirror symmetry the polar duality is applied to special $d$-dimensional convex lattice polytopes which are called reflexive polytopes.

It was observed by Victor Batyrev and Duco van Straten that the method of Philip Candelas et al. for computing the number of rational curves on Calabi–Yau quintic 3-folds can be applied to arbitrary Calabi–Yau complete intersections using the generalized $A$-hypergeometric functions introduced by Israel Gelfand, Michail Kapranov and Andrei Zelevinsky (see also the talk of Alexander Varchenko), where $A$ is the set of lattice points in a reflexive polytope $P$.

The combinatorial mirror duality for Calabi–Yau hypersurfaces in toric varieties has been generalized by Lev Borisov in the case of Calabi–Yau complete intersections in Gorenstein toric Fano varieties. Using the notions of dual cone and polar cone one can consider the polar duality for reflexive polytopes as a special case of the duality for convex Gorenstein cones and of the duality for Gorenstein polytopes.

For any fixed natural number $d$ there exists only a finite number $N(d)$ of $d$-dimensional reflexive polytopes up to a $GL(d,\Z)$-isomorphism. The number $N(d)$ is known only for $d \leq 4$: $N(1) =1$, $N(2) =16$, $N(3) = 4319$, $N(4)= 473 800 776.$ The combinatorial classification of $d$-dimensional reflexive simplices up to a $GL(d,\Z)$-isomorphism is closely related to the enumeration of all solutions $(k_0, k_1, \ldots, k_d) \in \N^{d+1}$ of the diophantine equation $\frac{1}{k_0} + \cdots + \frac{1}{k_d} =1$. The classification of 4-dimensional reflexive polytopes up to a $GL(4, \Z)$-isomorphism is important for constructing many topologically different 3-dimensional Calabi–Yau manifolds using hypersurfaces in 4-dimensional toric varieties which are Gorenstein Fano varieties. The complete list of 3-dimensional and 4-dimensional reflexive polytopes have been obtained by physicists Maximilian Kreuzer and Harald Skarke using a special software in Polymake.

A mathematical explanation of the combinatorial mirror symmetry has been obtained by Lev Borisov via vertex operator algebras which are algebraic counterparts of conformal field theories.

== See also ==
- Toric variety
- Homological mirror symmetry
- Mirror symmetry (string theory)
