= Base camp (disambiguation) =

A base camp is a staging area used by mountaineers to prepare for a climb.

- Everest base camps

Base camp or basecamp may also refer to:

- Basecamp (company), a web application company
  - Basecamp (software), a project management tool developed by the Basecamp company
- Basecamp Productions, a record label
- Basecamp Valley, in the Jones Mountains of Antarctica
- Garmin BaseCamp, a tool for managing geographical data
- Military camp

== See also ==
- Base (disambiguation)
- Camp (disambiguation)
