= Bases =

Bases may refer to:

- Bases (fashion), a military style of dress adopted by the chivalry of the sixteenth century
- the plural form of base (disambiguation)
- the plural form of basis (disambiguation)

== See also ==
- Base (disambiguation)
