= BVA =

BVA may refer to:

- Bahujan Vikas Aghadi, a political party in Palghar District of Maharashtra state of India
- The IATA-Code of Beauvais-Tillé Airport, a small airport serving the city of Beauvais, France
- Bilateral Valuation Adjustment, BVA = DVA - CVA, a netted X-Value Adjustment in relation to derivative instruments held by banks
- Blinded Veterans Association, a U.S.-based organization established to help military veterans "meet and overcome the challenges of blindness"
- Board of Veterans' Appeals, a U.S. government tribunal established to decide cases regarding benefits claimed by military veterans
- Bond Volunteer Aspirants, a training and evaluation period for selection in the elite American drill unit The Summerall Guards
- Boundary Value Analysis, in computer software testing
- British Radio Valve Manufacturers' Association, a defunct trade body in the United Kingdom
- British Veterinary Association, the national body for vets in the United Kingdom
- British Video Association, former name of the British Association for Screen Entertainment
- Federal Office of Administration (Bundesverwaltungsamt) in Germany
- BVA, Australian Hip Hop MC and member of Mnemonic Ascent
- Brooklyn Visions Academy, a fictional high school appearing in Marvel Comics
