= Quaternionic eigenvalue problem =

In linear algebra, the quaternionic eigenvalue problem is the problem of determining the eigenvalues and eigenvectors of a matrix with quaternionic entries. Unlike the classical eigenvalue problem over the complex numbers, where multiplication is commutative, two distinct problems can be considered: the right eigenvalue problem and the left eigenvalue problem.

== History ==
The study of eigenvalues of quaternionic matrices began in the late 1940s with the work of H. C. Lee, who established quaternionic analogues of several classical results of matrix theory, including a version of Shcur's triangularization theorem. Afterwards, N. A. Wiegmann established the existence of a Jordan canonical form for quaternionic matrices. Most of this early work focused on the right eigenvalue problem. In the 1980s, R. M. W. Wood proved the existence of left eigenvalues. Subsequent work by W. So, L. Huang and others developed computational methods, localization theorems and classifications of left eigenvalues for low-dimensional quaternionic matrices.

In the early 2000s, the subject expanded into infinite-dimensional operator theory through the development of slice hyperholomorphic function theory. This led to the introduction of the S-spectrum and the quaternionic functional calculus by F. Colombo, I. Sabadini, providing a complete framework for the spectral theory of quaternionic linear operators. Recent work has also explored applications of this theory to fractional difussion processes.

== Applications ==
Quaternionic eigenvalue problems appear naturally in quaternionic quantum mechanics, where observables and evolution operators are represented by quaternionic linear operators. Quaternionic matrices are also used in applied mathematics and engineering, for instance colour image processing and signal processing.

== Background ==
=== Quaternions ===
Multiplication rules of the imaginary units

The quaternions, denoted by $\mathbb{H}$, are a four-dimensional associative algebra over the real numbers. Every quaternion can be written uniquely in the form

$q=a+bi+cj+dk,$

where $a,b,c,d\in\mathbb{R}$ and the imaginary units satisfy

$i^2=j^2=k^2=ijk=-1.$

Unlike the real and complex numbers, quaternion multiplication is not commutative. For example,

$ij=k,\qquad\text{whereas}\qquad ji=-k.$

Every nonzero quaternion has a multiplicative inverse. The quaternions therefore form a division ring (also called skew field), but not a field. This makes quaternionic linear algebra distinct to real and complex linear algebra.

=== Quaternionic vector spaces ===
Since quaternions form a noncommutative division ring, scalar multiplication on a quaternionic vector space must be specified to act either on the left or on the right. A left quaternionic vector space (or left $\mathbb H$-module) is an abelian group equipped with a scalar multiplication

$$\begin{aligned}
V\times\mathbb H&\to V\\
(v,q)&\mapsto qv
\end{aligned}$$

satisfying the vector space axioms. Similarly, a right quaternionic vector space (or right $\mathbb H$-module) is an abelian group equipped with a scalar multiplication

$$\begin{aligned}
V\times\mathbb H&\to V\\
(v,q)&\mapsto vq
\end{aligned}$$

satisfying the same axioms. Accordingly, two notions of quaternionic linear map arise. If V is a right quaternionic vector space, a map $T:V\to V$ is right-linear if

1. for every $v,w\in V$, $T(v+w)=T(v)+T(w),$
2. for every $v\in V$ and $q\in\mathbb H$, $T(vq)=T(v)q .$

Similarly, if V is a left quaternionic vector space, a map $T:V\to V$ is left-linear if

1. for every $v,w\in V$, $T(v+w)=T(v)+T(w),$
2. for every $v\in V$ and $q\in\mathbb H$, $T(qv)=qT(v) .$

Once a basis has been chosen, every right-linear map on an $n$-dimensional right quaternionic vector space is represented by an $n \times n$ matrix with quaternionic entries. In this case matrix multiplication is defined in the usual way and satisfies $A(vq)=A(v)q$, thus being a right linear map.

== Right eigenvalue problem ==
For a matrix $A\in M_n(\mathbb{H})$, the right eigenvalue problem consists of finding a nonzero vector $v\in\mathbb{H}^n$ and a quaternion $\lambda\in\mathbb{H}$ such that

$Av=v\lambda.$

The quaternion $\lambda$ for which the above equation holds is called a right eigenvalue of $A$. The set of right eigenvalues of $A$ is called right spectrum of $A$, denoted by $\sigma_R(A)$. If $v$ is replaced by $vq$ for some nonzero quaternion $q$, the corresponding eigenvalue becomes $q^{-1}\lambda q$, since

$A(vq)=(vq) (q^{-1}\lambda q).$

This is the first distinctive feature of the right eigenvalue problem: in contrast with the classical problem, where an $n \times n$ matrix admits at most $n$ distinct eigenvalues, some quaternionic matrices admit an infinite number of eigenvalues. Nevertheless, the eigenvalues can be organized in a finite number of equivalence classes, also referred to as eigenvalue class. The eigenvalue class generated by $\lambda$ is defined by

$[\lambda]= \{\mu\in\mathbb{H} : \mu = q^{-1}\lambda q,\quad q\in\mathbb{H}\setminus\{0\}\}$

Zhang showed that the number of eigenvalue classes is finite. The precise statement is the following

Theorem— Let $A$ be an $n \times n$ matrix with quaternionic entries. Then $A$ has exactly $n$ eigenvalues classes.

Note that, if one is restricted the classic eigenvalue problem over the complex numbers, the eigenvalue classes are simply the singletons $[\lambda]= \{\lambda\}$. Therefore the above theorem is a direct generalization of classic result: a complex matrix of size $n$ has $n$ (complex) eigenvalues.

=== Computing the right spectrum ===
Lee characterizes an algorithm to compute the eigenvalues of a quaternionic matrix :

1. Decompose the quaternionic matrix $A$ as $A_1+A_2 j$ with $A_1, A_2\in M_n(\mathbb{C})$. Consider the companion matrix associated with $A$ (also called complex adjoint matrix or adjoint of the matrix $A$ ) defined by
  $$\chi(A) = \begin{pmatrix}
A_1 & A_2 \\
-\overline{A_2} & \overline{A_1}
\end{pmatrix}.$$
2. Compute the eigenvalues of the matrix $\chi(A)$, also called the standard eigenvalues of $A$. As a complex matrix, one can use classic techniques to compute its eigenvalues.
3. Each conjugate pair of eigenvalues $\lambda, \overline{\lambda}$ of $\chi(A)$ generates the same eigenvalue class $[\lambda]$ of the original matrix $A$.

=== Canonical forms ===
The classical canonical forms of complex matrices admit extensions to the quaternionic context. In particular, the Schur decomposition and the Jordan normal form generalize to quaternionic matrices by using right eigenvalues, more specifically the standard eigenvalues.

Lee proved that any quaternionic matrix $A \in M_n(\mathbb{H})$ is unitarily similar to an upper triangular matrix whose diagonal entries correspond to the standard eigenvalues of the matrix $A$. Brenner later gave an alternative treatment of this result. The precise statement is as follows.

Theorem— Let $A \in M_n(\mathbb{H})$. Then there exists a unitary matrix (Note: Unitary in the sense of quaternions. The definition is the same as for complex matrices but one requires quaternionic conjugation.) $V$ with quaternionic coefficients such that $V^*AV$ is upper triangular, whose diagonal elements are the standard eigenvalues of $A$.

Wiegmann proved that every quaternionic matrix is similar to a matrix in Jordan canonical form. The Jordan blocks are determined by the standard eigenvalues and classify quaternionic matrices up to similarity. The precise statement is as follows.

Theorem—Let $A \in M_n(\mathbb{H})$. Then there exists an invertible matrix P with quaternionic coefficients such that $P^{-1}AP$ has the Jordan canonical form, whose diagonal elements are the standard eigenvalues of $A$.

== Left eigenvalue problem ==
In contrast with the right eigenvalue problem, the theory of left eigenvalues is less developed and exhibits several phenomena with no classic analogue. Their systematic study began through the work of Wood, Huang and So, and others. For a matrix $A\in M_n(\mathbb{H})$, a quaternion $\lambda$ is called left eigenvalue of $A$ if there exists a nonzero vector $v\in\mathbb{H}^n$ such that

$Av=\lambda v.$

The set of left eigenvalues of $A$ is called left spectrum of $A$ and its denoted by $\sigma_L(A)$. Huang and So showed, even a $2\times 2$ quaternionic matrix can have both finite and infinite number of left eigenvalues. Namely, the following theorem is proved

Theorem—Let
$$A = \begin{pmatrix} a& b \\ c & d\end{pmatrix} \in M_2(\mathbb{H})$$
. Then $\sigma_L(A)$ is infinite if and only if $bc\neq 0$, $b^{-1}(a-d)$, $b^{-1}c \in\mathbb{R}$ and $\Delta = (b^{-1}(a-d))^2+4b^{-1}c<0$. In this case

$\sigma_L(A) = \left\{\frac{a+d}{2} + \frac{b}{2}x: \overline{x} = -x, |x|^2 = |\Delta| \right\}.$

Left eigenvalues do not have similar properties to right eigenvalues. For instance, unlike right eigenvalues, left eigenvalues are not invariant under similarity transformations. If $B=P^{-1}AP$, the left spectra of $A$ and $B$ need not coincide. Indeed, if $Av=\lambda v$, then

$B(P^{-1} v) = P^{-1}\lambda v .$

Since quaternionic scalars do not commute with the entries of $P^{-1}$, the identity $P^{-1}\lambda v = \lambda P^{-1} v$ does not generally hold. Consequently, $P^{-1} v$ need not be a left eigenvector of $B$ associated with the same eigenvalue. For this reason, left eigenvalues do not give rise to a Jordan canonical form analogous to that associated with right eigenvalues.

== Infinite dimensional case ==
The theory of quaternionic matrices extends to bounded linear operators on infinite-dimensional quaternionic Hilbert and Banach spaces. In this setting, however, the classical notion of eigenvalue is insufficient for developing a spectral theory analogous to that of complex operators. Namely, the noncommutativity of the quaternions prevents the direct extension of the classical resolvent operator $(A-\lambda I)^{-1}$ to this setting.

For this reason, the $S$-spectrum was introduced. For a bounded right-linear operator $T$, the $S$-spectrum is defined as

$\sigma_S(T)=\{ s\in\mathbb{H} : T^2-2\operatorname{Re}(s)\,T+|s|^2I \text{ is not invertible } \}.$

The $S$-spectrum generalizes several properties of the spectrum of a complex operator while respecting the quaternionic structure. Later it was shown to agree with the right spectrum of a quaternionic operator acting on a quaternionic right Banach space.

== See also ==
- Eigenvalues and eigenvectors
- Quaternion
- Spectral theory
