= Hypertoric variety =

In mathematics, a hypertoric variety or toric hyperkähler variety is a quaternionic analog of a toric variety constructed by applying the hyper-Kähler quotient construction of N. J. Hitchin, A. Karlhede, and U. Lindström et al. (1987) to a torus acting on a quaternionic vector space. Roger Bielawski and Andrew S. Dancer (2000) gave a systematic description of hypertoric varieties.
