= Tropical compactification =

Mathematical concept

In algebraic geometry, a tropical compactification is a compactification (projective completion) of a subvariety of an algebraic torus, introduced by Jenia Tevelev. Given an algebraic torus and a connected closed subvariety of that torus, a compactification of the subvariety is defined as a closure of it in a toric variety of the original torus. The concept of a tropical compactification arises when trying to make compactifications as "nice" as possible. For a torus $T$ and a toric variety $\mathbb{P}$, the compactification $\bar{X}$ is tropical when the map

$$\Phi: T \times \bar{X} \to \mathbb{P},\ (t,x) \to tx$$

is faithfully flat and $\bar{X}$ is proper.

== See also ==
- Tropical geometry
- GIT quotient
- Chow quotient
- Toroidal embedding
