= The Base =

The Base may refer to:

== Organizations ==
- The Base (hate group), an accelerationist, neo-Nazi white separatist paramilitary hate group
- The Base (Sardinian political party), a political party in Sardinia, Italy
- Al-Qaeda (Arabic for "the Base"), a militant Salafist Islamist multi-national organization
- De Basis (Dutch for "the Base"), a political party in the Netherlands, formerly known as the Basic Income Party
- Grassroots Democratic Party of Germany, abbreviated dieBasis (German for "theBase"), a political party in Germany

== Other uses ==
- The Base (shopping centre), a regional shopping centre located in Hamilton, New Zealand
- The Base (film), a 1999 American action-adventure film directed by Mark L. Lester
- The Base 2 (film), also known as The Base 2: Guilty as Charged, a 2000 American action-adventure film directed by Mark L. Lester

== See also ==
- Base (disambiguation)
- Al-Qaeda (disambiguation)
