= Base =

Base or BASE may refer to:

== Science and technology ==
- Base (chemistry), a substance that can accept hydrogen ions (protons)
- Base, an attribute to medication in pure form, for example erythromycin base
- Base, one of the three terminals of a Bipolar junction transistor
- BASE experiment, an antiproton experiment at CERN
- Base pair, a pair of connected nucleotides on complementary DNA and RNA strands
- Beta-alumina solid electrolyte, a fast ion conductor material
- Nucleobase, in genetics, the parts of DNA and RNA involved in forming base pairs
- Base (blockchain), an Ethereum layer 2 blockchain

=== Computing ===
- BASE (search engine), a search engine for scholarly internet resources, created by Bielefeld University Library
- <base />, an HTML element
- Basically Available, Soft state, Eventual consistency (BASE), a consistency model
- LibreOffice Base, LibreOffice's database module
- OpenOffice.org Base, OpenOffice.org's database module, also known as ooBase

=== Mathematics ===
- Base of computation, commonly called radix, the number of distinct digits in a positional numeral system
- Base of a logarithm, the number whose logarithm is 1
- Base (exponentiation), the number b in an expression of the form b^{x}
- Base (geometry), a side of a plane figure (for example a triangle) or face of a solid
- Base (group theory), a sequence of elements not jointly stabilized by any nontrivial group element.
- Base (topology), a type of generating set for a topological space

== Social science ==
- Base (politics), a group of voters who almost always support a single party's candidates
- Base and superstructure, parts of society in Marxist theory
- base slang / argot (cliques or sub-culture) for freebase cocaine

== Organizations and enterprises ==
- Backward Society Education, a Nepali non-governmental organization
- BASE (mobile operator), a Belgian mobile telecommunications operator
- BASE (social centre), a self-managed social centre in Bristol, UK
- Base CRM, an enterprise software company founded in 2009 with offices in Mountain View and Kraków, Poland
- Base Design, an international design, communications, audiovisual, copywriting and publishing firm
- Base FX, a visual effects and animation company founded in 2006 with studios in Beijing, Wuxi and Xiamen, China
- Budapest Aircraft Services, callsign BASE
- Beaverton Academy of Science and Engineering, in Hillsboro, Oregon, US
- Bible Archaeology Search and Exploration Institute
- British Association for Screen Entertainment
- Brooklyn Academy of Science and the Environment, a high school in New York, US
- Federal Office for the Safety of Nuclear Waste Management, a German federal environmental authority
- Google Base, an online database provided by Google

== Sports ==
- Base (baseball), a station that must be touched by a runner
- Base, a position in some cheerleading stunts
- BASE jumping, parachuting or wingsuit flying from a fixed structure or cliff
- Base, a variant name for the children's game darebase

== Other uses ==
- Base (character), character in Marvel Comics
- Base (EP), an album by South Korean singer Kim Jonghyun
- Base, Maharashtra, a village in India
- Base, or binder (material), a material that holds paint or other materials together
- Base, or foundation (architecture), the lowest and supporting layer of a structure
- Base, or foundation (cosmetics), a cosmetic applied to the face
- Base (heraldry), the lower part of the shield in heraldry
- Base of operations (headquarters)
- Base or pedestal, a supporting feature of a statue or other item
- Baseball metaphors for sex
- Cooking base, a concentrated flavouring compound
- Military base, or non-military base camp, a bivouac which provides shelter, military equipment and personnel
- Rob Base (1967–2026), American rapper

== See also ==
- Based
- Base camp (disambiguation)
- Bases (disambiguation)
- Basis (disambiguation)
- Bass (disambiguation)
- Bottom (disambiguation)
- Radix (disambiguation)
- The Base (disambiguation)
