= Vasilii Iskovskikh =

Russian mathematician (1939–2009)

Vasilii (or Vasily) Alekseevich Iskovskikh (Василий Алексеевич Исковских, 1 July 1939, Orenburg Oblast – 4 January 2009, Moscow) was a Russian mathematician, specializing in algebraic geometry.

== Education and career ==
Born into a peasant family, Iskovskikh entered in 1958 the Physics and Mathematics Faculty of Tashkent State University. In 1963, as an outstanding student, he was invited to become a student at the Faculty of Mechanics and Mathematics of Moscow State University. There he became an active participant in Igor Shafarevich's seminar and, following the recommendation of Yuri Manin, studied birational geometry. After graduating in 1964, Iskovskikh entered the graduate school of the Faculty of Mechanics and Mathematics of Moscow State University and received in 1968 his Candidate of Sciences degree (PhD) under the supervision of Yuri Manin.

Iskovskikh worked from 1968 to 1974 at the Central Economics and Mathematics Institute of the Russian Academy of Sciences and from 1974 to 1977 at the All-Russian Research Institute of Integrated Automation of the Oil and Gas Industry. In the Department of Higher Algebra of Moscow State University's Faculty of Mechanics and Mathematics, he was from 1977 to 1987 a senior researcher, from 1987 to 1990 a leading researcher, and from 1990 until his death a professor. In the Department of Number Theory of the Steklov Institute of Mathematics, he did research since 1990 and was appointed a professor in 1992. In 1990 he received his Russian Doctor of Sciences degree (habilitation).

All of Iskovskikh's research is connected with Shafarevich's Moscow school of algebraic geometry. Shafarevich's school included the construction of a systematic theory of algebraic surfaces, including the theory of rational surfaces with rich birational geometry. Continuing the fundamental research of Yuri Manin, Iskovskikh obtained the first important results on the birational type of rational surfaces; the results were published in his PhD thesis.

Much of the modern development of birational geometry began with Iskovskikh and Manin's «Трехмерные квартики и контрпримеры к проблеме Люрота» (Матем. сб., 1971, т. 86, No. 1) (Three-dimensional quartics and counterexamples to the Luröth problem) (Mat. Sb., 1971, vol. 86, no. 1, pp. 140–166). In it, an effective method (the "method of maximal singularities") is constructed, which allows one to comprehensively describe birational maps of rationally connected three-dimensional manifolds. The three-dimensional quartic is foundational for modern research in birational geometry.

In the 1970s Iskovskikh applied the method of maximal singularities to prove important theorems on birational maps of several classes of Fano threefolds. The theorems provided general principles for birational classification in dimension three. Iskovskikh and Manin's research made three-dimensional birational geometry into a systematic theory.

Iskovskikh gave a biregular classification of Fano 3-folds. His results on Fano 3-folds lead to the success of Mori's theory in the 1980s. Iskovskikh obtained a complete classification of minimal rational surfaces over arbitrary fields and studied the groups of birational automorphisms for all classes of birational surfaces over any perfect field. He is the author or coauthor of more than 80 scientific publications, including 2 monographs. His PhD students include Valery Alexeev, Victor Batyrev and Dmitri Olegovich Orlov.

In 1983 Iskovskikh was an Invited Speaker with talk Algebraic 3-folds with special regard to the problem of rationality at the International Congress of Mathematicians in Warsaw. In 2000 he was awarded the A.A. Markov Prize of the Russian Academy of Sciences. In 2002 he was made an Honorary Doctor of the University of Turin. In 2008 he was elected a corresponding member of the Russian Academy of Sciences.

From June 29 to July 3, 2009, the Steklov Institute held an international conference on the geometry of algebraic varieties as a memorial to V. A. Iskovskikh.

== Selected publications ==
- with Igor Shafarevich: Algebraic Surfaces, In: I. R. Shafarevich (ed.): Algebraic Geometry II, Encyclopedia of Mathematical Sciences, vol. 35, Springer 2013 reprint of 1996 edition, pp. 127–154 (originally published in Russian in 1989)
- with Yuri Manin: Трехмерные квартики и контрпримеры к проблеме Люрота, Mat. Sbornik, vol. 86, 1971, pp. 140–166
- with Yu. G. Prokhorov: Fano Varieties. In A. N. Parshin, I. Shafarevich (eds.): Algebraic Geometry V. Encyclopedia of Mathematical Sciences, Springer, 1999
- Fano 3-folds. (Russian), Parts 1 & 2, Mat. USSR Izv., vol. 11, 1977, pp. 485–527, vol. 12, 1978, pp. 469–506; Part 1; Part 2
