= Basics =

Basics or BASICS may refer to:

== Arts and entertainment ==
- Basics (Houston Person album), a 1989 album by saxophonist Houston Person
- Basics (Paul Bley album), a 2001 solo album by pianist Paul Bley
- "Basics" (Star Trek: Voyager), the 42nd and 43rd episodes of the American science fiction television Star Trek: Voyager
- The Basics, an Australian band
- The Basics (TV show), a 2021 American web series
- "Basics", a 2022 song by Twice from Between 1&2

== Other uses ==
- British Association for Immediate Care, an association of prehospital health care professionals

== See also ==
- Basic (disambiguation)
- Back to Basics (disambiguation)
