= Basic =

Basic or BASIC may refer to:

== Science and technology ==
- BASIC, a computer programming language
- Basic (chemistry), having the properties of a base
- Basic access authentication, in HTTP

== Entertainment ==
- Basic (2003 film), an American thriller film
- Basic (2026 film), an American comedy film
- Basic, one of the languages in Star Wars

=== Music ===
- Basic (Glen Campbell album), 1978
- Basic (Robert Quine and Fred Maher album), 1984
- B.A.S.I.C. (Alpinestars album), 2000
- Basic (Brown Eyed Girls album), 2015
- B.A.S.I.C. (The Basics album), 2019

== Places ==
- Basic, Mississippi, a community in the US
- BASIC countries, Brazil, South Africa, India and China in climate change negotiations

== Organizations ==
- BASIC Bank Limited, government owned bank in Bangladesh
- Basic Books, an American publisher

== Other uses ==
- Basic (cigarette), a brand of cigarettes manufactured by the Altria Group (Philip Morris Company)
- Basic (dance move), the dance move that defines the character of a particular dance
- Basic (slang), a pejorative term in American English
- British American Security Information Council, a think tank based in London
- Bašić, South Slavic surname

== See also ==
- Basic English, an English-based controlled language with a limited vocabulary
- Visual Basic (classic), a computer programming language
  - Visual Basic .NET, a computer programming language based on the .NET Framework
- Basics (disambiguation)
- Base (disambiguation)
- Basis (disambiguation)
- Basic mandate, an aspect of the electoral system
