= Chloe Troast =

American comedian (born 1997)

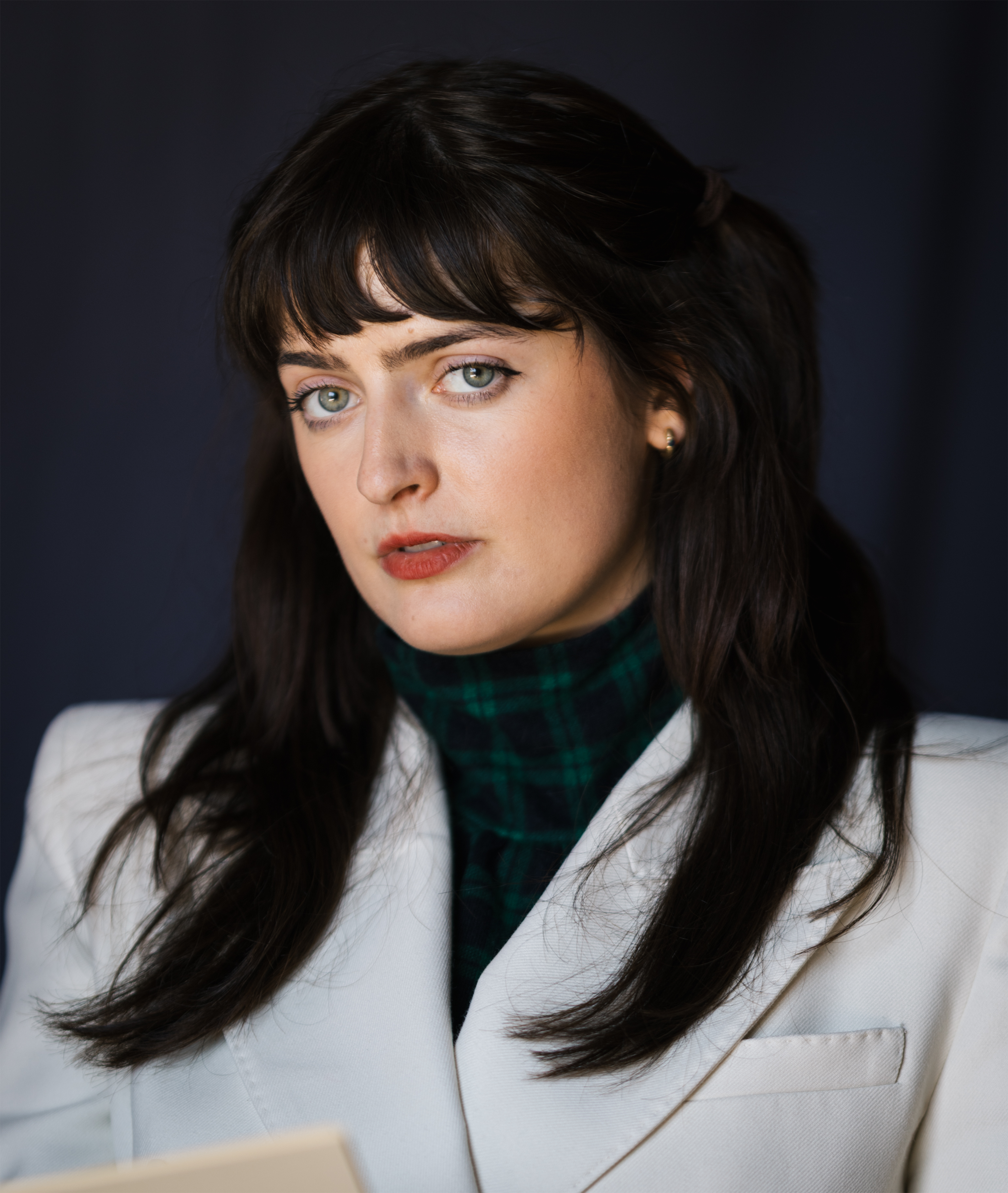
- Troast in May 2025
- Born: Chloe Eileen Troast; May 13, 1997 (age 29); Ho-Ho-Kus, New Jersey, U.S.
- Education: New York University (BA)
- Occupations: Actress; comedian
- Years active: 2019–present

Chloe Eileen Troast (born May 13, 1997) is an American comedian and actress. Troast was featured on the NBC sketch comedy series Saturday Night Live for its 49th season.

== Early life ==
Troast was raised in Ho-Ho-Kus, New Jersey, and graduated from Northern Highlands Regional High School in 2015. In 2021, Troast directed and starred in the music video for The Convenience song "Saturday's Child".

Troast attended New York University, where she got an individualized degree at the Gallatin School of Individualized Study (which she describes as "basically just an English degree") and a minor in Middle Eastern Islamic studies. She sang at her college graduation.

== Career ==
Troast has performed improv, stand-up, and sketch comedy in New York City, sometimes embodying an Old Hollywood character named Pepper Slit. Troast co-wrote and starred in the web series on The Basics (2021). In 2023, she participated in the Montreal comedy festival Just for Laughs and was named one of its 2023 New Faces of Comedy.

She has frequently collaborated with the comedy trio Please Don't Destroy and appeared in the film Please Don't Destroy: The Treasure of Foggy Mountain.

After auditioning and coming close to joining the cast the previous season, Troast made her Saturday Night Live debut on October 14, 2023, as the only new featured performer that year. She departed the show the following year after the show producers decided not to keep her on the cast. She played Hannah in the romantic comedy film Sweethearts, and appeared on the Adult Swim Smalls series Dohl's. In November of 2025, Troast co-created, and starred in, a web series entitled Spilling Your Seed with Chloe Troast, a parody of genealogy shows such as Finding Your Roots.

== Personal life ==
Troast lives in Brooklyn, New York.

== Filmography ==
Film

| Year | Title | Role | Notes |
|---|---|---|---|
| 2023 | Please Don't Destroy: The Treasure of Foggy Mountain | Poppy | |
| 2024 | Goodrich | Chloe | |
| 2024 | Sweethearts | Hannah | |

Television

| Year | Title | Role | Notes |
|---|---|---|---|
| 2021 | The Basics | Tiggy | Main role |
| 2023–2024 | Saturday Night Live | Various | Cast member (20 episodes) |
| 2025 | The Four Seasons | Mikayla | Episode: "Fun" |
| 2026 | The Fall and Rise of Reggie Dinkins | Jynnysyz | Episode: "The World Is Full of Beaks" |
| 2026 | Furious | Becky | 3 episodes |
| 2026 | Adults | Hannah | Episode: "Marathon Day" |
| 2026 | Elsbeth | Norma Douglass | Episode: "Lean Girls" |
