= Château du Touvet =

13th century French castle

Coordinates: 45.3634°N 5.9465°E

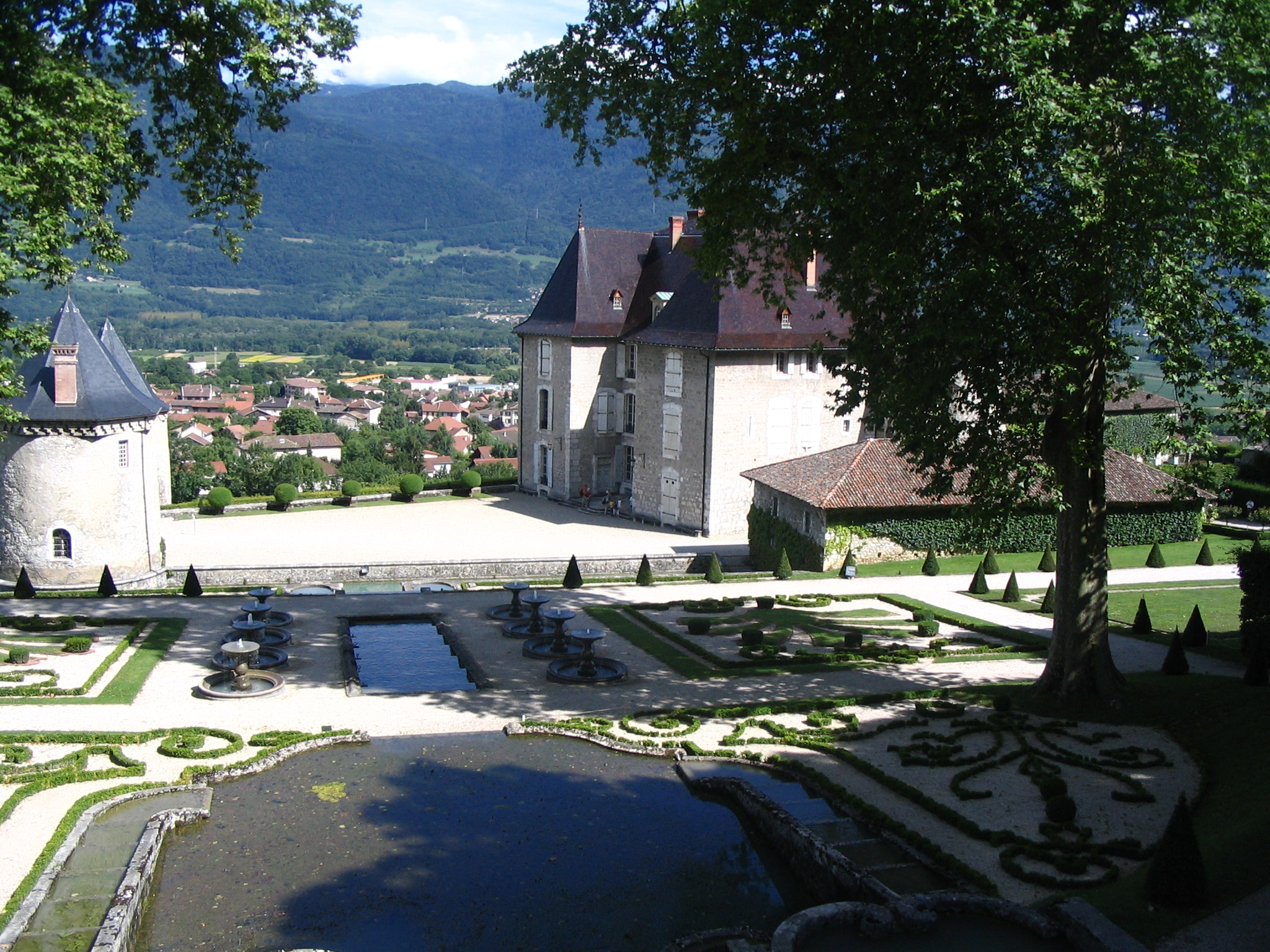
the castle and the water stairway

The Château du Touvet is a French castle built in the 13th century, with a garden à la française and a water garden built in the 18th century, located between Grenoble and Chambéry in the Isère Department of the Rhône-Alpes Region of France. The gardens are classified among the notable gardens of France by the French Ministry of Culture. The chateau and gardens are privately owned, but open to the public.

== Description ==
The 13th-century castle has five towers, a moat and a drawbridge. Within the castle is the residence rebuilt in the 18th century, with the original furnishings and paneling.

The 7-hectare garden features a stairway of water, using a hydraulic system built in the 18th century. The garden is made up of a series of terraces, with six parterres of broderies made of boxwood. It also has a small enclosed garden, called the jardin de la comtesse; a kitchen garden, and an alley of linden trees.

== History ==
The castle has been in the same family for five hundred years. It was originally built in the 13th century to guard the borders of France against the Dukes of Savoy. In the 18th century, Pierre de Marcieu, the Lieutenant-General and commander in chief of Dauphiné, rebuilt the chateau and built the gardens around it. The water garden was created between 1758 and 1765.

Owners of the castle included Guigues Guiffrey, a member of the court of King Francis I, and French Ambassador to the court of Henry VIII; and Nicolas Charles Oudinot, a Marshal of France serving under Napoleon Bonaparte. The castle is currently owned by Bruno and Isabelle de Quinsonas, descendants of the original owners.

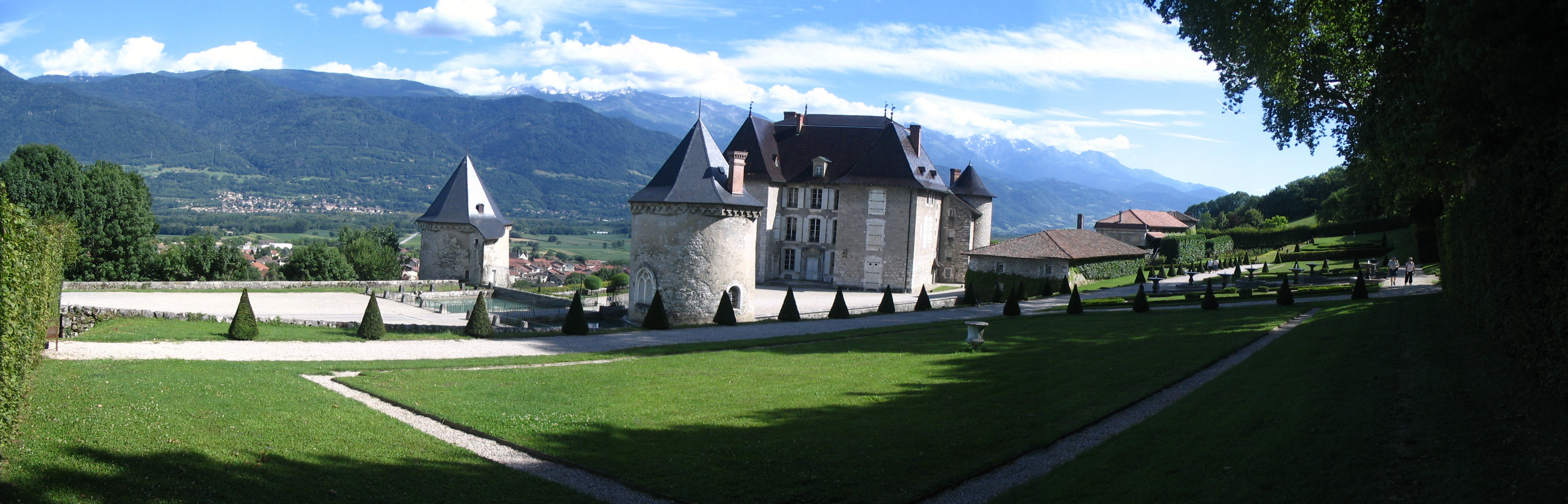
The Chateau of Touvet dominates the valley of Grésivaudan, between Grenoble and Chambéry.
