= Toroidal embedding =

Concept in algebraic geometry

In algebraic geometry, a toroidal embedding is an open embedding of algebraic varieties that locally looks like the embedding of the open torus into a toric variety. The notion was introduced by Mumford to prove the existence of semistable reductions of algebraic varieties over one-dimensional bases.

== Definition ==
Let X be a normal variety over an algebraically closed field $\bar{k}$ and $U \subset X$ a smooth open subset. Then $U \hookrightarrow X$ is called a toroidal embedding if for every closed point x of X, there is an isomorphism of local $\bar{k}$-algebras:

$$\widehat{\mathcal{O}}_{X, x} \simeq \widehat{\mathcal{O}}_{X_{\sigma}, t}$$

for some affine toric variety $X_{\sigma}$ with a torus T and a point t such that the above isomorphism takes the ideal of $X - U$ to that of $X_{\sigma} - T$.

Let X be a normal variety over a field k. An open embedding $U\hookrightarrow X$ is said to a toroidal embedding if $U_{\bar{k}}\hookrightarrow X_{\bar{k}}$ is a toroidal embedding.

== See also ==
- tropical compactification
