= Treasury basis trade =

Treasury basis trading: bond and futures arbitrage strategy

Treasury basis trading is a financial strategy that involves taking offsetting positions in a cash market instrument (typically a U.S. Treasury bond) and its related derivative, such as a Treasury futures contract. The strategy seeks to exploit pricing discrepancies between the two instruments, which are expected to converge over time. It is a specialized form of basis trading applied to U.S. government securities.

== Mechanics of the trade ==
In a typical Treasury basis trade, a trader:

- Buys a Treasury bond in the cash market (often financing the purchase via repurchase agreements, or repos), and
- Sells short a corresponding Treasury futures contract.

The expectation is that the price differential (or "basis") between the cash bond and the futures contract will narrow favorably before the futures contract expires. The trade becomes profitable if the bond price, plus coupon income and financing costs, is lower than the futures delivery price at expiration.

== Definition of basis ==
"Basis" in this context refers to the difference between the price of a spot (cash) instrument and its corresponding futures contract. It is commonly calculated as:

- Basis = Cash Price − Futures Price, though the reverse is also used in some contexts.

Each futures delivery month may have a different basis, reflecting changes in interest rates, time to maturity, and liquidity conditions.

== Leverage and risk ==
Treasury basis trading is typically executed with significant leverage. In the post-2008 regulatory environment – and especially beginning in the early 2020s – hedge funds have commonly executed basis trades with leverage levels of 10x to 20x (meaning the size of the position is 10 to 20 times the capital used to fund it). This level of leverage is often attractive when financing bond purchases through the repo market at relatively low cost.

In practice, repo rates are typically quoted either as an annualized percentage (e.g., 4.85%) or as a spread over a benchmark risk-free rate such as the Secured Overnight Financing Rate (SOFR) or the Federal funds rate. Pricing reflects collateral quality, duration, counterparty structure, and broader market liquidity conditions. Repo rates may tighten significantly when specific bonds are “on special” or during periods of elevated demand for secured financing.

Leverage amplifies potential returns but also increases exposure to small price movements, margin calls, and liquidity shocks. If both the cash bond and the futures price move adversely, or if the basis widens unexpectedly (rather than converging), the trade can result in large losses. In times of market stress—such as sharp movements in Treasury yields or tightening repo conditions—forced unwinds (Note: Unwind: In finance, to "unwind" means to close out or reverse a position, often under adverse conditions. See the fifth definition of unwind on Wiktionary.) of basis trades can exacerbate market volatility.

== Market impact and current relevance ==
As of 2025, Treasury basis trades are estimated to account for $1 to $2 trillion in gross notional exposure, (Note: Gross notional exposure: In leveraged strategies such as basis trading, the term refers to the total face value of all positions—both long (e.g., Treasury securities) and short (e.g., futures contracts)—without netting. It differs from gross exposure, which sums the absolute value of long and short positions regardless of instrument type, and from net exposure, which offsets long and short exposures to calculate directional risk.) with a significant concentration among large hedge funds. This level of exposure has drawn increased scrutiny from regulators, including the Bank of England, which in 2023 warned that hedge fund basis trades had reached a then-record high of $800 billion and posed systemic risks due to extreme leverage and liquidity strain during periods of market stress.

== Academic and regulatory perspectives ==
=== Regulatory concerns ===
In December 2023, the Bank of England's Financial Policy Committee (FPC) raised concerns about the scale and risk of Treasury basis trades, noting that leveraged hedge funds had built up record short positions in Treasury futures—used as part of basis trading strategies. The FPC highlighted the potential for these positions to amplify market volatility during periods of stress, citing risks related to high leverage, low margin requirements, and the reliance on short-term repo financing. According to the FPC, while the basis trade can improve liquidity in normal conditions, it may act as a transmission channel for systemic instability in volatile markets.

In 2023, global regulators — including the U.S. Securities and Exchange Commission (SEC), the European Union, and the UK Financial Conduct Authority — intensified scrutiny of Treasury basis trades, citing concerns over systemic risk and hidden leverage in the shadow banking sector. New SEC rules were adopted to increase transparency in the Treasury market and limit certain forms of leveraged trading.

In 2025, economists Anil Kashyap, Jeremy Stein, Jonathan Wallen, and Joshua Younger proposed the creation of a "basis purchase facility" to help the Federal Reserve manage risks arising from large-scale, leveraged Treasury basis trades. Rather than intervene through broad asset purchases — as it did in March 2020 — the Fed could instead buy Treasury securities while simultaneously selling futures to hedge interest rate risk. The authors argued that this approach would distinguish financial stability operations from monetary policy, limit moral hazard, and reduce pressure on bond dealers during disorderly unwinds. The proposed facility aims to prevent destabilizing forced unwinds by acting as a liquidity backstop while maintaining neutrality in interest rate policy.

=== Academic reflections ===
Finance professor Craig Pirrong has argued that Treasury basis trades may be viewed as a form of "leverage intermediation," allowing non-leveraged asset managers to indirectly access leverage through futures contracts, with hedge funds acting as intermediaries. Pirrong characterizes this process as "leverage laundering," where regulatory or institutional constraints on direct leverage lead asset managers to rely on structured exposure through futures. He asserts that this intermediation chain – spanning asset managers, hedge funds, dealer banks, and money markets – could introduce unnecessary systemic risk, especially during episodes of volatility or liquidity stress, such as the March 2020 "dash for cash." (Note: March 2020 "Dash for Cash": During March 2020, at the onset of the COVID-19 pandemic, investors rapidly liquidated a wide range of assets—including U.S. Treasuries—to raise cash, in what became known as the "dash for cash." This led to severe stress in normally liquid government bond markets, as even safe assets came under selling pressure. The dislocation prompted major central banks, including the Federal Reserve and the Bank of England, to intervene by purchasing government bonds to restore market function. The episode revealed the fragility of key funding markets and the potential for leveraged strategies, such as basis trades, to exacerbate volatility during liquidity shocks.)

== Participants and market structure ==
Treasury basis trading typically involves a network of institutional participants that span the asset management, hedge fund, dealer banking, and short-term funding (see Money market and Repurchase agreement) sectors.

While this article focuses on the U.S. Treasury market, similar basis trading strategies exist in other government bond markets — such as German Bunds, Japanese government bonds (JGBs), UK gilts, French OATs, and Italian BTPs (typically traded against Eurex futures such as Schatz, Bobl, and Bund). Comparable strategies also exist with AGBs, Korean Treasury Bonds (KTBs), Chinese Government Bonds (CGBs), and Brazilian carry trades involving DI futures and LTN or NTN-F bonds. Although the basic mechanics are similar, market structure, liquidity, and repo infrastructure can vary significantly. Outside the United States, this type of government bond arbitrage is often referred to as "cash and carry arbitrage" or simply a "carry trade."

=== Hedge funds and asset managers ===
Leveraged hedge funds are the primary participants in Treasury basis trades. These funds use capital from institutional investors to take short positions in Treasury securities and long positions in Treasury futures, aiming to profit from price convergence. Some large asset managers may also engage indirectly in basis trading by allocating capital to hedge funds or structured investment vehicles.

=== Dealer banks and prime brokers ===
Dealer banks (i.e., banks that make markets and provide repo/futures financing), broker-dealer, and prime brokers provide financing for the long Treasury positions through the repo market. They also facilitate short futures positions by providing margin accounts and clearing services. These institutions may act as intermediaries, earning fees and spreads, or as counterparties taking principal risk.

=== Repo and clearing infrastructure ===
The financing leg of the trade is often conducted in the triparty repo market or through bilateral repos. Key clearing entities, such as the Fixed Income Clearing Corporation (FICC), play a role in settlement and risk mitigation. The efficiency of this infrastructure affects the cost and stability of basis trades.

=== Central counterparties and futures exchanges ===
Short futures positions are typically cleared through central counterparties such as the CME Group. Margin requirements, delivery options, and contract specifications influence which bonds are cheapest to deliver and therefore affect the basis calculation.

=== Regulatory and central bank oversight ===
Regulators and central banks monitor basis trading activity for systemic risk implications. In particular, the SEC, Federal Reserve, and Bank of England have raised concerns about the scale of hedge fund participation, reliance on short-term leverage, and the potential for disorderly unwind scenarios during periods of market stress.

== History of basis trading ==
Treasury basis trading emerged in the early 1980s alongside the development of Treasury futures markets, particularly the introduction of the 10-year Treasury note futures contract on the Chicago Board of Trade. The strategy gained traction in the 1990s as hedge funds and proprietary trading desks began exploiting pricing differences between cash Treasury securities and their corresponding futures contracts. Use of the strategy expanded significantly after the 2008 financial crisis, as regulatory reforms pushed banks to reduce trading inventories, while hedge funds—often financing positions through the repo market—took on a growing role as intermediaries. Though legally permitted and long considered a form of market arbitrage, basis trading has drawn increased regulatory scrutiny in the 2020s due to concerns over systemic risk and hidden leverage.

== See also ==
- Arbitrage
- Basis swap
- Futures contract
- Hedge fund
- Repurchase agreement
- System Open Market Account – The Federal Reserve’s portfolio for Treasury and agency securities purchased via open market operations; used during crises to stabilize markets, including Treasury liquidity events relevant to basis trade dynamics.

== Bibliography ==
=== References ===
- Agnew, Harriet [at Wikidata] (December 18, 2023). "Asset Management: The Year That Was". Financial Times. London. Retrieved April 10, 2025. ISSN 0307-1766; OCLC 60638918 (all editions).
1. Financial Times.
2. ProQuest. ProQuest 2902853053. ProQuest 2902853053 (ABI/Inform and Research Library database).
- CME Group. "10-Year Treasury Note Futures: Contract Specs". CME Group.
- Financial Stability Board (November 17, 2020). "Holistic Review of the March Market Turmoil". Financial Stability Board.
- Harris, Alexandra (March 27, 2025). "Fed Urged to Explore Hedge Fund Bailout Tool for Basis Trade". Bloomberg News. Archived from the original on March 27, 2025 – via Yahoo Finance (archived via Wayback Machine). EBSCOhost 184085577
- Hull, John C. (2006). Options, Futures, and Other Derivatives (searchable; but, not borrowable online) (6th ed.). Prentice Hall. ISBN 978-0-13-149908-9. LCCN 2005-47692; ISBN 0-1314-9908-4; OCLC 1411561951, 60321487.
- Pirrong, Craig (November 7, 2023). "The Basis For the Treasury Basis Trade: Leverage Laundering?". Streetwise Professor (academic blog). Chatham, New Jersey. ProQuest 2886687487. ProQuest 2886687487, 2886685041 (ABI/Inform database).
- Wigglesworth, Robin (December 6, 2023). "The Bank of England Is Still Worried v v About Treasury Basis Trades – The Raised Eyebrow Has Been Deployed". Financial Times. London. Retrieved April 10, 2025. ISSN 0307-1766; OCLC 60638918 (all editions).
1. Financial Times.
2. ProQuest. ProQuest 2898273026. ProQuest 2898273026 (ABI/Inform and Research Library database).

=== General references ===
- Market Structure Subcommittee, Market Risk Advisory Committee (MRAC) (December 2024). "The Treasury Cash-Futures Basis Trade and Effective Risk Management Practices". Report assistance by (i) Richard Berner, PhD; (ii) David Bowman; (iii) Alessandro Cocco; (iv) Timothy Cuddihy; (v) Conor Sari; (vi) Samuel Schulhofer-Wohl, PhD; and (vii) Nathaniel "Nate" Wuerffel. U.S. Commodity Futures Trading Commission, Commissioner Kristin N. Johnson, Sponsor of the MRAC, Alicia Crighton, Chair of the MRAC.
