= Guigues Guiffrey =

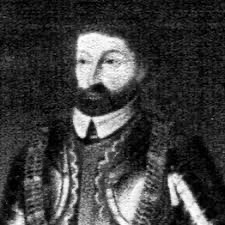

Guigues Guiffrey, Seigneur de Boutières, (Manoir de la Tour, Le Cheylas, 13 May 1497 - Château du Touvet, 21 December 1545), was a French military commander in the Italian Wars.

== Biography ==
In 1521, he served under Chevalier Bayard in the Siege of Mézières in the Ardennes, and in 1524 he commanded a company of gendarmes in the Defense of Marseille against the Imperial forces.

He married Gasparde Berlioz in 1526.
On 25 September 1527, he was part of a delegation sent by Francis I to London to conclude an alliance with Henry VIII against Emperor Charles V.

The French king, Francis I, named him military governor of Turin, Italy, in 1537, but because of his mediocre administrative talents he served just a short time. He acquired the Château du Touvet during the same year.

In 1544, he commanded the French forces in the Piedmont but when he allowed the town of Carignano to fall to the enemy, he fell into disgrace and was relieved of his command. On the nomination of the Count of Enghien as his replacement, he took part under the orders of this new general in the Battle of Ceresole, where he won fame through his skillful use of the cavalry charge.

He ended his military career in fighting the English during the French invasion of the Isle of Wight in 1545.
