= The Basics (TV show) =

American web series

The Basics is an American web series six-episode created by Liz Demmon, Rachel Horwitz, Mahayla Laurence, Chloe Troast, and Jamie Linn Watson. It is directed by Mary Clare Plaschke and Ryan Beggs. The show follows five young women, Kendyll Lyndsay, Becka, Maegaen, Tiggy, and MJ as they attempt to conquer the male-dominated world of New York City comedy. The self proclaimed "girl-bosses" must overcome their perceived vapidness and femininity to make a name for themselves in the indie comedy sphere.

The Basics originally premiered on Vimeo on January 15, 2021. It was also made available on IGTV, with one episode releases every Friday. The project was initially launched on Kickstarter where it raised over $13,000. The Basics was an official selection of the 2021 NY Lift-Off Film festival.

== Plot ==
MJ becomes committed to putting the girl gang onto her new found love, improv, which she discovers after attending a comedy show while on a date. MJ begins to form her dream team of girl bosses after recruiting cousin Tiggy. Each episode of the first season is dedicated to a different member of the girl-gang, allowing for a wealth of character development. The show works to break down some of the perceived barriers of entering the comedy world as a woman. By exploring how the feminine interacts within a male dominated space, the web series is a testament to the freedom of trying new things and the reward of being fearless. The women's improv journey culminates with a performance at the Sip and Laugh Rosé Improv Festival, where they are pushed to their professional limits.

The show works as an ironic illumination of the misogyny in the improv community by creating female characters who represent the juxtaposition of their male counterparts. There is a deep history of misogyny within the comedy community, and this show is empowered by its female lead cast to flip the script.

== Episodes ==
=== Web series ===
The six-episode web series follows each one of the main characters as they work their way toward the Sip and Laugh Rosé Improv Festival

Season 1
Episode	Title	Written by	Release date
1	"MJ"	Jamie Linn Watson	January 15, 2021
		MJ is introduced to improv after going on a date.	
2	"Becka"	Rachel Horwitz	January 15, 2021
		Improv helps lift Becka out of a funk and find her confidence.	
3	"Maegaen"	Mahayla Laurence	January 15, 2021
		A relatively together Maegaen decides to throw caution to the wind when Improv comes into her life. She is dedicated to the cause, leaving her old life behind.	
4	"Tiggy"	Chloe Troast	January 15, 2021
		Tiggy is quirky, but is there more than meets the eye? Could Tiggy be the mastermind the group needs?	
5	"Kendyll Lyndsay"	Liz Demmon	January 15, 2021
		Tensions rise between Kendyll and Tiggy as the group must conquer interpersonal issues within their girl gang.	
6	"Finale"	Liz Demmon, Rachel Horwitz, Mahayla Laurence, Chloe Troast, and Jamie Linn Watson	January 22, 2021
		The group's first Improv Festival should go off without a hitch. Right!	

== Cast ==
The Basics includes...

Jamie Linn Watson as MJ

Chloe Troast as Tiggy

Mahayla Laurence as Maegaen

Rachel Horwitz as Becka

Liz Demmon as Kendyll Lyndsay

== Production ==
The show ultimately is a product of NYU students. The actors, director, and producer all attended NYU, with most attending New York University Tisch School of the Arts. The entirety of the budget for the project, which was $13,000 was raised on Kickstarter. Production for the web series occurred over three consecutive weekends. Budget and available favors meant the series was shot on three separate cameras, the Arri Amira, Arri Alexa Mini, and the Canon C300. The creators of the show were inspired by high grade cinematography, using jump cuts, and zooms to elevate the elements of comedy that are lost without a live audience. While the subject of the show centered around a group of all female improvisors, the crew's camera team also improvised a lot of the jump cuts and zooms while filming. This earned the show a spot on the online Glamour (magazine) watch list in January.

The show has received mild success, stirring up a buzz in local, independent spheres, and continues to post updates to social media, including their Instagram.

The show's director and producer, MC Plaschke has worked on a variety of shorts and episodic installments for independent NYC comedians.

Director and producer, Ryan Beggs, is also an NYU graduate who has worked as a comedian and improvisor as well.
