= Basis set =

Basis set may refer to:

- Basis (linear algebra)
- Basis set (chemistry)
