= Garmin BaseCamp =

Garmin GPS mapping software

- Developer: Garmin

Stable release(s)
- Windows: 4.7.5 / March 27, 2023; 2 years ago
- macOS: 4.8.13 / March 31, 2023; 2 years ago
- Operating system: Windows, macOS
- Type: Geographic information system / GPS navigation device utility software
- License: Proprietary (free download)
- Website: www.garmin.com/en-US/shop/downloads/basecamp

Garmin BaseCamp is a map viewing / GIS software package offered free for download by Garmin, primarily intended for use with their GPS navigation devices. BaseCamp serves as a replacement to the now unsupported Garmin MapSource.

== Features ==
- View map and satellite imagery and transfer it to the GPS device.
- Plan trips by entering routes and waypoints and transferring them to the device.
- Geotag photos and export them to e.g. Picasa.

== Mac ==
The Mac version has not been updated for ARM CPUs, and when launched on M1/M2 CPUs will run on Rosetta 2.
