= Al-Qaeda (disambiguation) =

al-Qaeda is an Islamist multinational militant organization.

al-Qaeda (Arabic: القاعدة, lit. 'foundation') may also refer to:

- Al-Qaeda Squad of Meme, an Ambazonian separatist group
- Al-Qaidah, former newspaper in Iraq
- Qaida (book) (Urdu: قاعده), a series of books for learning Quranic Arabic intended for beginners.
