= Basis of Union =

Basis of Union may refer to:

- Basis of Union (Uniting Church in Australia) (1977)
- Basis of Union (Presbyterian Church of Australia) (1901)
