= Basecamp Productions =

American record label

- Parent company: Warner Music Group (as of 2009)
- Founded: 2004; 22 years ago
- Founder: Joshua James; Brett Eliason

Basecamp Productions is an American record label. It was founded in 2004 by Joshua James and Brett Eliason (Eliason apparently sold his share of the company sometime in 2007 and is no longer involved) with the idea of releasing "Official Bootlegs" online.

Beginning with Pearl Jam’s groundbreaking “Official Bootlegs” series, artists who have appeared on recordings distributed exclusively by Basecamp include: Pearl Jam, Linkin Park, Jay-Z, U2, Disturbed Chris Cornell, Tori Amos, Ben Harper, The Black Crowes, The Cult, Busta Rhymes, Sleater-Kinney, Kings of Leon, Mudhoney, My Morning Jacket, Sonic Youth, Dispatch, Third Day and Wolfmother.

Basecamp works with artists who sell their shows through their own web sites. Shows are typically available anywhere from 30 minutes to a few days following the performance. Basecamp handles the whole process from recording the show, mixing it and then releases it through their own software package which is installed on the artists site. Basecamp also has partnerships with both Ticketmaster and Live Nation to sell the live recordings at the point of ticket purchase.

Basecamp was acquired by Warner Music Group in 2009 and Mr. James is now the CEO of Zig Media.
