= Toric ideal =

Ideal generated by differences of monomials

In algebra, a toric ideal is an ideal generated by differences of two monomials. An affine or projective algebraic variety defined by a toric prime ideal or a homogeneous toric ideal is an affine or projective toric variety.
