= Base, Maharashtra =

Village in Maharashtra

Coordinates: 19°27′41.38″N 73°9′7.9″E

Base is a small village about 50 km from Thane city in India. Base is surrounded by Gondade, Shirole, Ijaripada and Karmale. It has post at Pachchapur and it is in Bhiwandi taluka. The temple of Vajreshwari and the hot water springs at Akloli are about 20 km from the village. According to the Indian census of 2001, the population of Base is composed of 566 (280 males, 286 females) in 121 households. The population of Base village is 750 as of the 2011 janganna.

An ancient Shiv mandir at Nandikeshwar is situated nearby. Nandikeshwar is the initiation point of Mahuli mountain where Mahuli Fort is located. The village has an ancient and temple to Hanuman. The village has an annual fair and Palakhi on Hanuman Jayanti and the next day a wrestling (कुस्ती) competition is held. The village is governed by Gram Panchayat including two more villages of Shirole and Mahap. The Sarpanch of the Group Grampanchayat Base is Krushna Shelar from Shirole village. Vidhi Vinod Palvi is Police Patil of Base village.
