= Bases (fashion) =

Military clothing

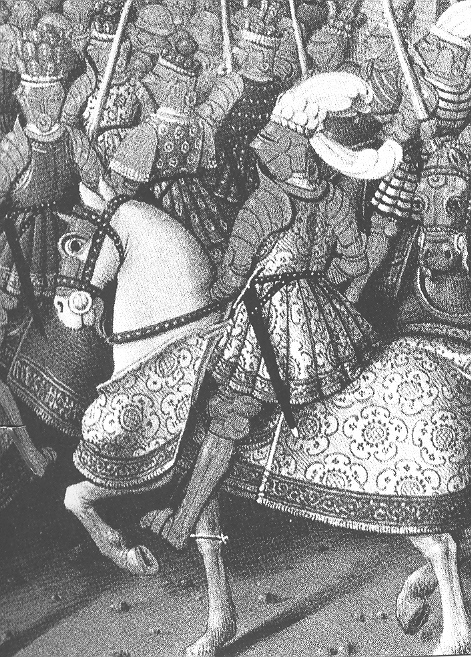
French gendarmes wearing bases as part of a doublet – bases composed only of a skirt (that is, from the waist down) were very common as well.

Bases are the cloth military skirts (often part of a doublet or a jerkin), generally richly embroidered, worn over the armour of later men-at-arms such as French gendarmes in the late 15th to early 16th century, as well as the plate armour skirt later developed in imitation of cloth bases for supplemental upper-leg protection, worn by men-at-arms for foot combat.

== Cloth bases ==
Italian armoured cavalry had been wearing bases, with or without a jerkin or vest for the chest as well, since the late 15th century. It appears that French gendarmes picked up the fashion in their interventions in Italy during the Italian Wars. Adopted by the French sometime after 1495, the fashion soon spread throughout Europe, and may be seen in illustrations throughout the Italian Wars. Such bases were knee-length and cartridge-pleated. Such skirts eventually evolved into quilted or padded breeches worn in the early 17th century.

== Plate armour bases ==
Plate armour for the upper legs, in imitation of the shape and style of cloth bases, came into fashion in the middle of the sixteenth century as well, and was also called "bases" as well as tonlet. It was worn for dismounted combat. There was a detachable rear piece for the steel bases to allow the man-at-arms to sit on his horse, although even without such rear piece it must have been rather difficult to mount and dismount when wearing plate armour bases.

== Gallery ==
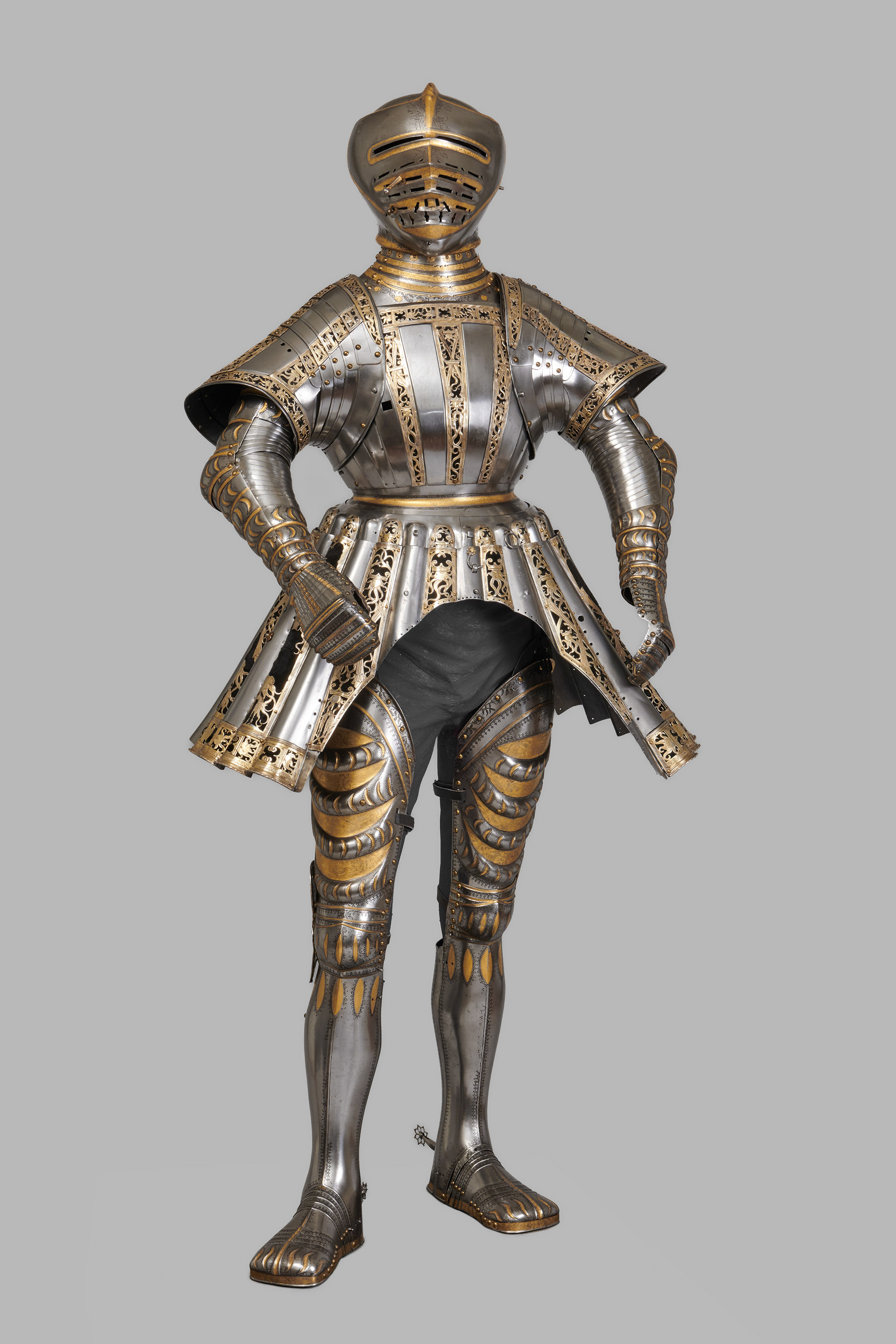

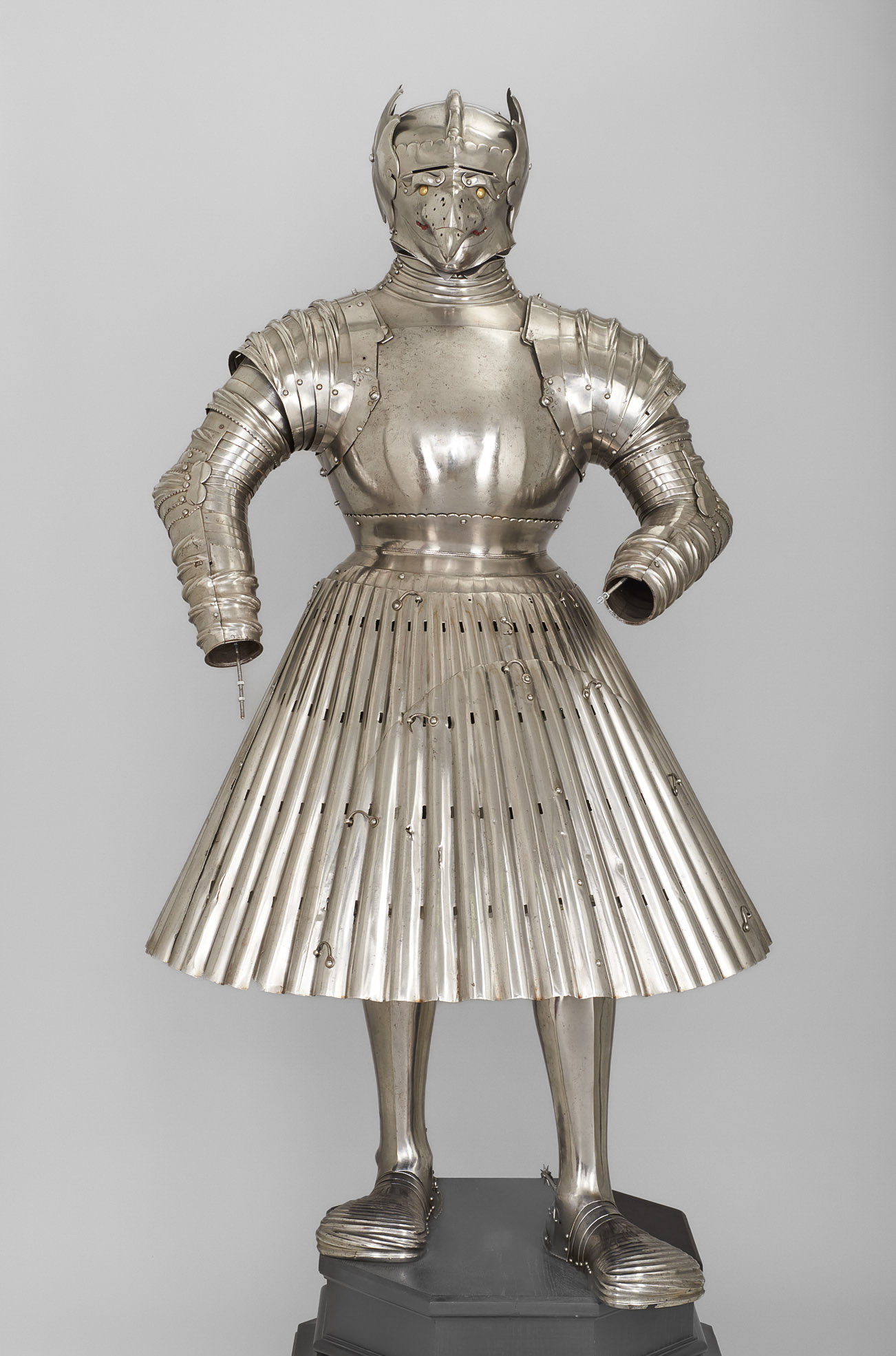

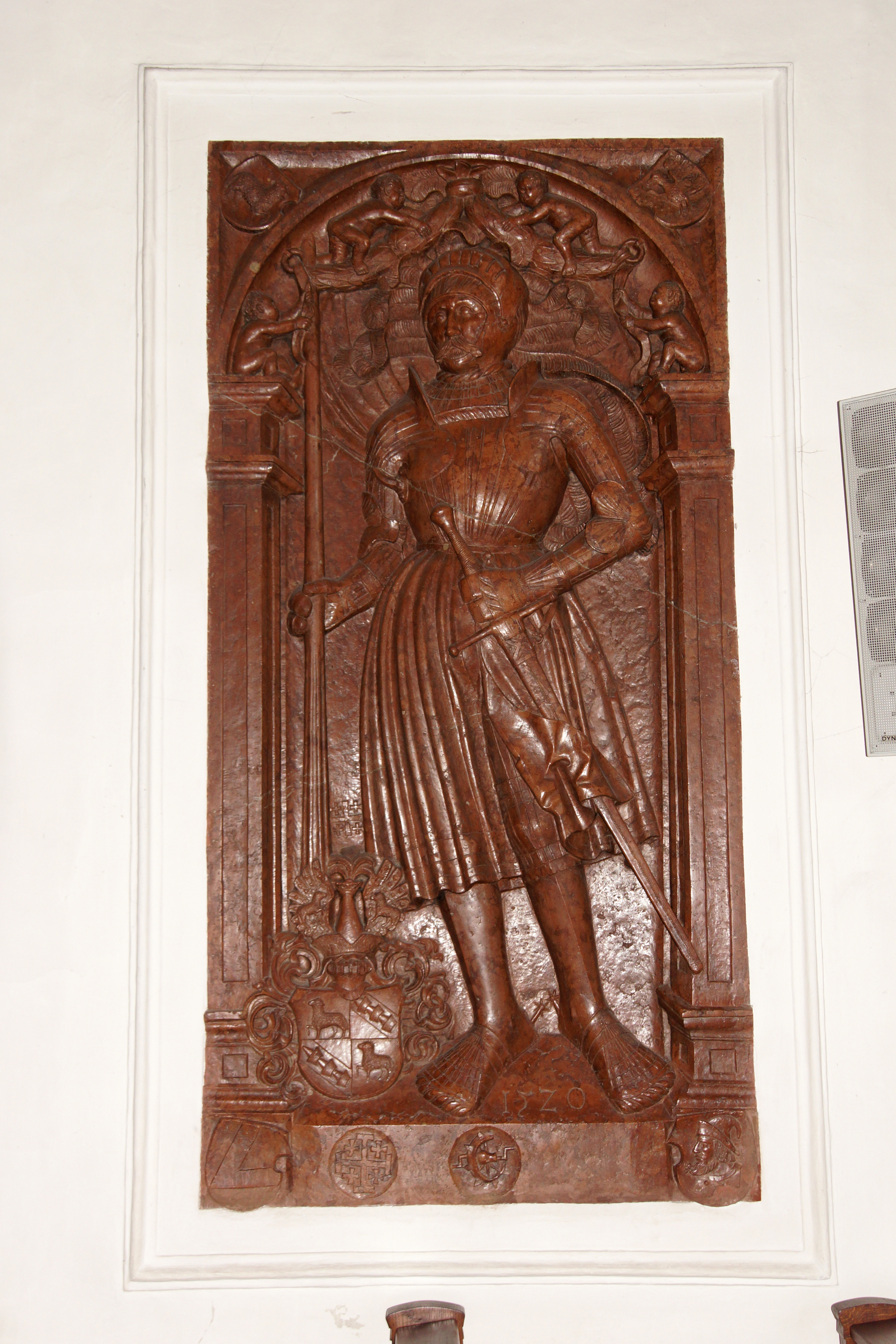
