= Quaternionic vector space =

Module over the algebra of quaternions

In noncommutative algebra, a branch of mathematics, a quaternionic vector space is a module over the quaternions. Since the quaternion algebra is division ring, these modules are referred to as "vector spaces". However, the quaternion algebra is noncommutative so we must distinguish left and right vector spaces. In left vector spaces, linear compositions of vectors $v$ and $w$ have the form $av+bw$ where $a$, $b\in H$. In right vector spaces, linear compositions of vectors $v$ and $w$ have the form $va+wb$.

Similar to vector spaces over a field, if a quaternionic vector space has finite dimension $n$, then it is isomorphic to the direct sum $H^n$ of $n$ copies of the quaternion algebra $H$. In this case we can use a standard basis which has the form

$$e_1=(1,0,\ldots,0)$$
$$\ldots$$
$$e_n=(0,\ldots,0,1)$$

In a left quaternionic vector space $H^n$ we use componentwise sum of vectors and product of vectors over scalars

$$(p_1, \ldots, p_n)+(r_1, \ldots, r_n) = (p_1+ r_1, \ldots, p_n+ r_n)$$
$$q (r_1, \ldots, r_n) = (q r_1, \ldots, q r_n)$$

In a right quaternionic vector space $H^n$ we also use componentwise sum of vectors and product of vectors over scalars

$$(p_1, \ldots, p_n)+(r_1, \ldots, r_n) = (p_1+ r_1, \ldots, p_n+ r_n)$$
$$(r_1, \ldots, r_n)q = ( r_1q, \ldots,  r_nq)$$

== See also ==
- Vector space
- General linear group
- Special linear group
- SL(n,H)
- Symplectic group
