= Basis trading =

Arbitrage strategy

Basis trading is a market-neutral arbitrage strategy that exploits the price difference between a price of an asset and its corresponding future market price. This difference is known as a 'basis' where the trader will profit from price discrepancies. Basis trading is also called the 'cash-and-carry trade'.

== Definition of basis ==
In finance, the basis typically refers to the difference between the spot price of an asset and the price of a related futures contract:

Basis = Spot price − Futures price

The spot price and future prices often differ due to multiple factors including interest rates, and supply and demand.

== Types of basis trading ==
- Long position: Buying and owning an asset with the expectation that its value will increase in the future.
- Short position: Selling an asset with the expectation that its price will decline and intending to repurchase it later at a lower price.

== Advantages and disadvantages ==
Advantages to using basis trading include:

- Generating potential steady profit from a volatile market.
- Provides price security for producers, consumers, and traders.
- Protection against price swings.

While the risk that might occur are:

- Complex trading environment for beginners.
- Thinly traded markets can have liquidity risks.
- Leverage misuse without proper risk management.

== See also ==
- Arbitrage
- Futures contract
- Basis swap
- Derivative (finance)
- Repo market
