= Basis (universal algebra) =

In universal algebra, a basis is a structure inside of some (universal) algebras, which are called free algebras. It generates all algebra elements from its own elements by the algebra operations in an independent manner. It also represents the endomorphisms of an algebra by certain indexings of algebra elements, which can correspond to the usual matrices when the free algebra is a vector space.

== Definitions ==
A basis (or reference frame) of a (universal) algebra is a function $b$ that takes some algebra elements as values $b(i)$ and satisfies either one of the following two equivalent conditions. Here, the set of all $b(i)$ is called the basis set, whereas several authors call it the "basis". The set $I$ of its arguments $i$ is called the dimension set. Any function, with all its arguments in the whole $I$, that takes algebra elements as values (even outside the basis set) will be denoted by $m$. Then, $b$ will be an $m$.

=== Outer condition ===
This condition will define bases by the set $L$ of the $I$-ary elementary functions of the algebra, which are certain functions $\ell$ that take every $m$ as argument to get some algebra element as value $\ell(m).$ In fact, they consist of all the projections $p_i$ with $i$ in $I,$ which are the functions such that $p_i(m) = m(i)$ for each $m$, and of all functions that rise from them by repeated "multiple compositions" with operations of the algebra.

(When an algebra operation has a single algebra element as argument, the value of such a composed function is the one that the operation takes from the value of a single previously computed $I$-ary function as in composition. When it does not, such compositions require that many (or none for a nullary operation) $I$-ary functions are evaluated before the algebra operation: one for each possible algebra element in that argument. In case $I$ and the numbers of elements in the arguments, or “arity”, of the operations are finite, this is the finitary multiple composition .)

Then, according to the outer condition a basis $b$ has to generate the algebra (namely when $\ell$ ranges over the whole $L$, $\ell(b)$ gets every algebra element) and must be independent (namely whenever any two $I$-ary elementary functions coincide at $b$, they will do everywhere: $\ell'(b)=\ell''(b)$ implies $\ell'=\ell''$). This is the same as to require that there exists a single function $\chi$ that takes every algebra element as argument to get an $I$-ary elementary function as value and satisfies $\chi({\ell(b)})=\ell$ for all $\ell$ in $L$.

=== Inner condition ===
This other condition will define bases by the set E of the endomorphisms of the algebra, which are the homomorphisms from the algebra into itself, through its analytic representation $\varrho$ by a basis. The latter is a function that takes every endomorphism e as argument to get a function m as value: $\varrho(e)=m$, where this m is the "sample" of the values of e at b, namely $m(i)=[\varrho(e)]_i=e(b(i))$ for all i in the dimension set.

Then, according to the inner condition b is a basis, when $\varrho$ is a bijection from E onto the set of all m, namely for each m there is one and only one endomorphism e such that $m=\varrho(e)$. This is the same as to require that there exists an extension function, namely a function $\eta$ that takes every (sample) m as argument to extend it onto an endomorphism $\eta(m)$ such that $\varrho(\eta(m))=m$.

The link between these two conditions is given by the identity $[\chi(a)]_m=[\eta(m)]_a$, which holds for all m and all algebra elements a. Several other conditions that characterize bases for universal algebras are omitted.

As the next example will show, present bases are a generalization of the bases of vector spaces. Then, the name "reference frame" can well replace "basis". Yet, contrary to the vector space case, a universal algebra might lack bases and, when it has them, their dimension sets might have different finite positive cardinalities.

== Examples ==
=== Vector space algebras ===
In the universal algebra corresponding to a vector space with finite dimension the bases essentially are the ordered bases of this vector space. Yet, this will come after several details.

When the vector space is finite-dimensional, for instance $I=\{0, 1, \ldots, n-1\}$ with $n > 0$, the functions $\ell$ in the set L of the outer condition exactly are the ones that provide the spanning and linear independence properties with linear combinations $\ell(b)=c_0 b_0+c_1b_1+\ldots c_{n-1}b_{n-1}$ and present generator property becomes the spanning one. On the contrary, linear independence is a mere instance of present independence, which becomes equivalent to it in such vector spaces. (Also, several other generalizations of linear independence for universal algebras do not imply present independence.)

The functions m for the inner condition correspond to the square arrays of field elements (namely, usual vector-space square matrices) that serve to build the endomorphisms of vector spaces (namely, linear maps into themselves). Then, the inner condition requires a bijection property from endomorphisms also to arrays. In fact, each column of such an array represents a vector $m(i)$ as its n-tuple of coordinates with respect to the basis b. For instance, when the vectors are n-tuples of numbers from the underlying field and b is the Kronecker basis, m is such an array seen by columns, $\varrho$ is the sample of such a linear map at the reference vectors and $\eta$ extends this sample to this map as below.

${}\qquad \left(\begin{array}{rrc} 0 & -1 & 2 \\ -2 & 3 & 1 \\ 1 & 0 & 2 \end{array}\right) \quad \begin{array}{c} \stackrel{\eta}{\longmapsto}\\ \stackrel{\varrho}{\longleftarrow\!\!{}^{{}_{\!{}_\mathsf{l}}}} \end{array} \quad \left\{ \begin{array}{rcrccr} x'_0 & = & & -x_1 &+& 2x_2 \\ x'_1 & = &-2x_0&+3x_1&+& x_2\\ x'_2 & = & x_0 & & +&2x_2 \end{array}\right.$

When the vector space is not finite-dimensional, further distinctions are needed. In fact, though the functions $\ell$ formally have an infinity of vectors in every argument, the linear combinations they evaluate never require infinitely many addenda $c_i m(i)$ and each $\ell$ determines a finite subset J of $I$ that contains all required i. Then, every value $\ell(m)$ equals an $\ell'(m')$, where $m'$ is the restriction of m to J and $\ell'$ is the J-ary elementary function corresponding to $\ell$. When the $\ell'$ replace the $\ell$, both the linear independence and spanning properties for infinite basis sets follow from present outer condition and conversely.

Therefore, as far as vector spaces of a positive dimension are concerned, the only difference between present bases for universal algebras and the ordered bases of vector spaces is that here no order on $I$ is required. Still it is allowed, in case it serves some purpose.

When the space is zero-dimensional, its ordered basis is empty. Then, being the empty function, it is a present basis. Yet, since this space only contains the null vector and its only endomorphism is the identity, any function b from any set $I$ (even a nonempty one) to this singleton space works as a present basis. This is not so strange from the point of view of universal algebra, where singleton algebras, which are called "trivial", enjoy a lot of other seemingly strange properties.

=== Word monoid ===
Let $I=\{ \mathsf{a, b, c,} \ldots\}$ be an "alphabet", namely a (usually finite) set of objects called "letters". Let W denote the corresponding set of words or "strings", which will be denoted as in strings, namely either by writing their letters in sequence or by $\epsilon$ in case of the empty word (formal language notation). Accordingly, the juxtaposition $vw$ will denote the concatenation of two words v and w, namely the word that begins with v and is followed by w.

Concatenation is a binary operation on W that together with the empty word $\epsilon$ defines a free monoid, the monoid of the words on $I$, which is one of the simplest universal algebras. Then, the inner condition will immediately prove that one of its bases is the function b that makes a single-letter word ${i}$ of each letter $\mathsf{i}$, $b(\mathsf{i})=i$.

(Depending on the set-theoretical implementation of sequences, b may not be an identity function, namely $i$ may not be $\mathsf{i}$, rather an object like $\{ (\emptyset,\mathsf{i})\}$, namely a singleton function, or a pair like $(\emptyset,\mathsf{i})$ or $(\mathsf{i},\emptyset)$.)

In fact, in the theory of D0L systems (Rozemberg & Salomaa 1980) such $m=\varrho(e)$ are the tables of "productions", which such systems use to define the simultaneous substitutions of every $i$ by a single word $w=m(\mathsf{i})$ in any word u in W: if $u={i}_0{i}_1\cdots {i}_k$, then $e(u)=m(\mathsf{i}_0)m(\mathsf{i}_1)\cdots m(\mathsf{i}_k)$. Then, b satisfies the inner condition, since the function $\varrho$ is the well-known bijection that identifies every word endomorphism with any such table. (The repeated applications of such an endomorphism starting from a given "seed" word are able to model many growth processes, where words and concatenation serve to build fairly heterogeneous structures as in L-system, not just "sequences".)
