= Toric variety =

Algebraic variety containing an algebraic torus

In algebraic geometry, a toric variety or torus embedding is a kind of algebraic variety that contains an algebraic torus whose group action extends to the whole variety. Toric varieties form an important and rich class of examples in algebraic geometry, which often provide a testing ground for theorems. The geometry of a toric variety is fully determined by the combinatorics of its associated fan, which often makes computations far more tractable. For a certain special but still quite general class of toric varieties, this information is also encoded in a convex polytope, which creates a powerful connection of the subject with convex geometry. Familiar examples of toric varieties are affine space, projective spaces, products of projective spaces and bundles over projective space.

== Definition ==
A precise definition is that a toric variety is an algebraic variety containing an algebraic torus as an open dense subset, such that the action of the torus on itself extends to the whole variety.

Some authors also require it to be normal.

== Toric varieties from tori ==
The original motivation to study toric varieties was to study torus embeddings. Given the algebraic torus $T$, the group of characters $\hom(T,\mathbb{C}^*)$ forms a lattice. Given a collection of points $\mathcal{A}$, a subset of this lattice, each point determines a map to $\mathbb{C}^*$ and thus the collection determines a map to $\left(\mathbb{C}^*\right)^{|\mathcal{A}|}.$ By taking the Zariski closure of the image of such a map, one obtains an affine variety. If the collection of lattice points $\mathcal{A}$ generates the character lattice, this variety is a torus embedding. In similar fashion one may produce a parametrized projective toric variety, by taking the projective closure of the above map, viewing it as a map into an affine patch of projective space.

Given a projective toric variety, observe that we may probe its geometry by one-parameter subgroups. Each one parameter subgroup, determined by a point in the lattice, dual to the character lattice, is a punctured curve inside the projective toric variety. Since the variety is compact, this punctured curve has a unique limit point. Thus, by partitioning the one-parameter subgroup lattice by the limit points of punctured curves, we obtain a lattice fan, a collection of polyhedral rational cones. The cones of highest dimension correspond precisely to the torus fixed points, the limits of these punctured curves.

== The toric variety of a fan ==
=== Affine toric variety and polyhedral cone ===
Suppose that $N$ is a finite-rank free abelian group, for instance the lattice $\mathbb{Z}^n$, and let $M$ be its dual. A strongly convex rational polyhedral cone in $N$ is a convex cone (of the real vector space of $N$) with apex at the origin, generated by a finite number of vectors of $N$, and that contains no line through the origin. These will be called "cones" for short. When generated by a set of vectors $v_1,\dots,v_k$, it is denoted $\text{cone}(v_1,\ldots,v_k)=\left\{\sum_{i=1}^ka_i v_i\colon a_i\in\mathbb{R}_{\geq 0}\right\}$. A one-dimensional cone is called a ray. For a cone $\sigma$, its affine toric variety $U_\sigma$ is the spectrum of the monoid algebra generated by the points of $M$ that are in the dual cone to $\sigma$.

=== Fundamental theorem for toric geometry ===
A (polyhedral) fan is a collection of (polyhedral) cones closed under taking intersections and faces. The underlying space of a fan $\Sigma$ is the union of its cones and is denoted by $|\Sigma|$.

The toric variety of a fan of strongly convex rational cones is given by taking the affine toric varieties of its cones and gluing them together by identifying $U_\sigma$ with an open subvariety of $U_\tau$ whenever $\sigma$ is a face of $\tau$. The toric variety constructed from a fan is necessarily normal. Conversely, every toric variety has an associated fan of strongly convex rational cones. This correspondence is called the fundamental theorem for toric geometry, and it gives a one-to-one correspondence between normal toric varieties and fans of strongly convex rational cones.

The fan associated with a toric variety condenses some important data about the variety. For example, the Cartier divisors are associated to the rays of the fan. Moreover, a toric variety is smooth, or nonsingular, if every cone in its fan can be generated by a subset of a basis for the free abelian group $N$, and it is complete if its fan is complete, that is, its underlying space is the whole vector space.

=== Morphisms of toric varieties ===
Suppose that $\Sigma_1$ and $\Sigma_2$ are fans in lattices $N_1$ and $N_2$, respectively. If $f$ is a linear map from $N_1$ to $N_2$ such that the image of every cone of $\Sigma_1$ is contained in a cone of $\Sigma_2$, then $f$ induces a morphism $f_*$ between the corresponding toric varieties. This map $f_*$ is proper if and only if the preimage of $|\Sigma_2|$ under the map $f$ is $|\Sigma_1|$.

=== Projective toric variety, the ones coming from polytopes ===
A toric variety is projective if it can be embedded in some complex projective space.

Let $P$ be a polytope. For any vertex $v$ of $P$, the normal cone of $P$ at vertex $v$ is the cone generated by the outer normals of the facets containing $v$. The normal fan of $P$ is the fan whose maximal cones are the normal cones at each vertex of $P$.

It is well known that projective toric varieties are the ones coming from the normal fans of rational polytopes.

For example, the complex projective plane $\mathbb{CP}^2$ comes from the triangle, or $2$-simplex. It may be represented by three complex coordinates satisfying

$$|z_1|^2+|z_2|^2+|z_3|^2 = 1 , \,\!$$

where the sum has been chosen to account for the real rescaling part of the projective map, and the coordinates must be moreover identified by the following $U(1)$ action:

$$(z_1,z_2,z_3)\approx e^{i\phi} (z_1,z_2,z_3) . \,\!$$

The approach of toric geometry is to write

$$(x,y,z) = (|z_1|^2,|z_2|^2,|z_3|^2) . \,\!$$

The coordinates $x,y,z$ are non-negative, and they parameterize a triangle because

$$x+y+z=1 ; \,\!$$

that is,

$$\quad z=1-x-y . \,\!$$

The triangle is the toric base of the complex projective plane. The generic fiber is a two-torus parameterized by the phases of $z_1,z_2$; the phase of $z_3$ can be chosen real and positive by the $U(1)$ symmetry.

However, the two-torus degenerates into three different circles on the boundary of the triangle i.e. at $x=0$ or $y=0$ or $z=0$ because the phase of $z_1,z_2,z_3$ becomes inconsequential, respectively.

The precise orientation of the circles within the torus is usually depicted by the slope of the line intervals (the sides of the triangle, in this case).

Note that this construction is related to symplectic geometry as the map
$$\begin{cases}\mathbb{CP}^2&\to \mathbb{R}_{\geq 0}\\(z_1,z_2,z_3)&\mapsto |z_1|+|z_2|+|z_3|\end{cases}$$
is related to the moment map for the action of $U(1)$ on the symplectic manifold $\mathbb{CP}^2$.

== Classification of smooth complete toric varieties ==
From the fundamental theorem for toric geometry, the classification of smooth complete toric varieties of complex dimension $n$ and with $m$ Cartier divisors is equivalent to that of smooth complete fans of dimension $n$ with $m$ rays.

=== Classification for small Picard number ===
The Picard number of a fan $\Sigma$ of dimension $n$ having $m$ rays is the quantity $m-n$. Note that it is actually the rank of the Picard group of the toric variety associated to $\Sigma$.

- The only toric variety of dimension $n$ and Picard number $1$ is the complex projective space $\mathbb{CP}^n$. Its associated fan has rays generated by $e_1,e_2,\ldots,e_n$ and $f=-\sum_{i=1}^n e_i$, for $e_1,e_2,\ldots,e_n$ a basis of $N$. The cones of this fan are $\text{cone}(e_1,\ldots,e_n)$, and $\text{cone}(e_1,\ldots,e_{i-1},f,e_{i+1},\ldots,e_n)$, for $i=1,\ldots,n$. This is the normal fan to a unimodular $n$-simplex and it is therefore projective, even though this is a trivial statement.
- P. Kleinschmidt classified every smooth compact toric varieties of Picard number $2$, they are all projective.
- Victor V. Batyrev classified every smooth compact toric varieties of Picard number $3$, they are all projective. This result was reproved by S. Choi and H. Park using different techniques.

The classification for Picard number greater than $3$ is not known.

=== Classification for small dimension ===
Smooth toric surfaces are easily characterized, they all are projective and come from the normal fan of polygons such that at each vertex, the two incident edges are spanned by two vectors that form a basis of $\mathbb{Z}^2$.

In particular, they are all obtained from consecutive blow-ups starting from either the complex projective plane, or from a Hirzebruch surface.

== Resolution of singularities ==
Every toric variety has a resolution of singularities given by another toric variety, which can be constructed by subdividing the maximal cones of its associated fan into cones of smooth toric varieties.

== Relation to mirror symmetry ==
The idea of toric varieties is useful for mirror symmetry because an interpretation of certain data of a fan as data of a polytope leads to a combinatorial construction of mirror manifolds.

== See also ==
- Gordan's lemma
- Spherical variety
- Toric ideal
- Toric stack (roughly this is obtained by replacing the step of taking a GIT quotient by a quotient stack)
- Toroidal embedding

== General references ==
=== Short surveys ===
- Cox, David (2003), "What is a toric variety?" (PDF), Topics in algebraic geometry and geometric modeling, Contemporary Mathematics, vol. 334, Providence, R.I.: American Mathematical Society, pp. 203–223, ISBN 0-8218-3420-7, MR 2039974
- Miller, Ezra (2008), "What is ... a toric variety?" (PDF), Notices of the American Mathematical Society, 55 (5): 586–587, MR 2404030

=== Articles ===
- Danilov, V. I. (1978), "Геометрия торических многообразий" (PDF), Uspekhi Matematicheskikh Nauk, 33 (2): 85–134, MR 0495499
  - Translated in Danilov, V. I. (1978), "The geometry of toric varieties", Russian Mathematical Surveys, 33 (2): 97–154, Bibcode:1978RuMaS..33...97D, doi:10.1070/RM1978v033n02ABEH002305

=== Books ===
- Kempf, G.; Knudsen, Finn Faye; Mumford, David; Saint-Donat, B. (1973), Toroidal Embeddings I, Lecture Notes in Mathematics, vol. 339, Berlin, New York: Springer-Verlag, doi:10.1007/BFb0070318, ISBN 978-3-540-06432-9, MR 0335518
- Oda, Tadao (1988), Convex bodies and algebraic geometry, Ergebnisse der Mathematik und ihrer Grenzgebiete (3) [Results in Mathematics and Related Areas (3)], vol. 15, Berlin, New York: Springer-Verlag, ISBN 978-3-540-17600-8, MR 0922894
- Fulton, William (1993), Introduction to toric varieties, Princeton University Press, ISBN 978-0-691-00049-7
- Cox, David A.; Little, John B.; Schenck, Hal (2011), Toric Varieties, Graduate Studies in Mathematics, vol. 124, American Mathematical Society, ISBN 978-1-4704-7820-9
- Buchstaber, Victor M.; Panov, Taras E. (2015), Toric topology, Mathematical Surveys and Monographs, vol. 204, Providence, RI: American Mathematical Society, doi:10.1090/surv/204, ISBN 978-1-4704-2214-1
