= British Association for Screen Entertainment =

Trade association

The British Association for Screen Entertainment (BASE) is a video home entertainment organisation established in 1980 as the British Video Association (BVA). Its members include the BBC and Hollywood studios. The association organises an annual awards ceremony (The BASE Awards, formerly the BVA Awards) in London. In 2003, the association reported a 61% increase of DVD sales alongside a tripling in the illegal downloading of film and television files. In 2010 the association publicised the fact that around six million people in the UK had failed to acquire a high-definition television signal for television sets that were HD ready.

In 2016 the association changed its name from the British Video Association to the British Association for Screen Entertainment.
