= Victor Batyrev =

Russian mathematician

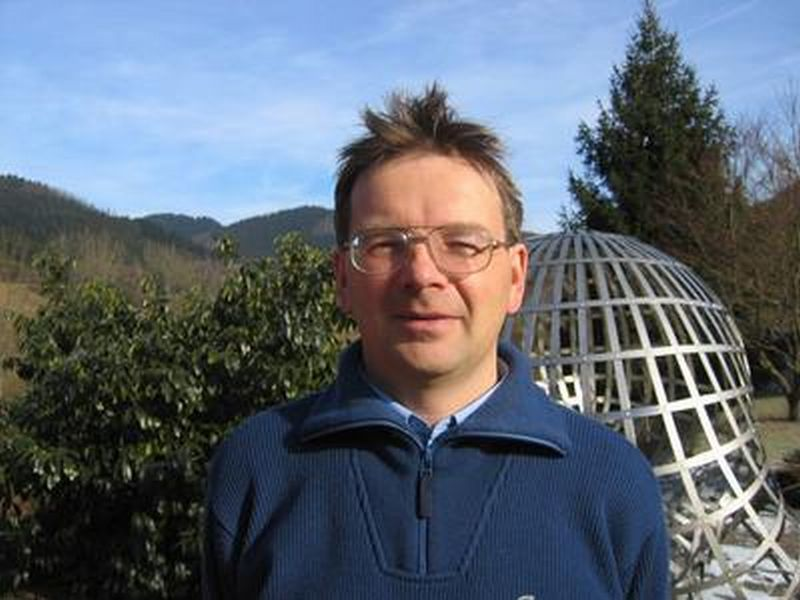
Victor Batyrev, Oberwolfach 2006

Victor Vadimovich Batyrev (Виктор Вадимович Батырев, born 31 August 1961, Moscow) is a Russian mathematician, specializing in algebraic and arithmetic geometry and its applications to mathematical physics. He is a professor at the University of Tübingen.

== Biography ==
Batyrev studied mathematics from 1978 to 1985 at Moscow State University. From 1991 he was at the University of Essen, where he earned his habilitation in 1993. Since 1996 he has been a professor at the University of Tübingen.

He received in 1994 the Gottschalk-Diederich-Baedeker Prize. In 1995 he received the Heinz Maier-Leibnitz Prize for his habilitation thesis Hodge Theory of Hypersurfaces in Toric Varieties and Recent Developments in Quantum Physics. In 1998 he was an invited speaker at the International Congress of Mathematicians in Berlin and gave a talk Mirror Symmetry and Toric Geometry. In 2003 he was elected a member of the Heidelberger Akademie der Wissenschaften.

== Selected publications ==
- Batyrev, V. V.; Manin, Yu. I. (1990). "Sur le nombre des points rationnels de hauté borné des variétés algébriques". Mathematische Annalen. 286 (1–3): 27–43. doi:10.1007/bf01453564. S2CID 119945673.
- Batyrev, Victor V. (1993). "Quantum cohomology rings of toric manifolds". Journées de Géométrie Algébrique d'Orsay (Orsay, 1992). Astérisque. Vol. 218. pp. 9–34. arXiv:alg-geom/9310004. MR 1265307.
- Batyrev, Victor V. (1994). "Dual polyhedra and mirror symmetry for Calabi–Yau hypersurfaces in toric varieties". Journal of Algebraic Geometry: 493–535. arXiv:alg-geom/9310003. Bibcode:1993alg.geom.10003B.
- Batyrev, Victor V.; Borisov, Lev A. (1996). "Mirror duality and string theoretic Hodge numbers". Inventiones Mathematicae. 126 (1): 183–203. arXiv:alg-geom/9509009. Bibcode:1996InMat.126..183B. doi:10.1007/s002220050093. S2CID 55227866.
- Batyrev, Victor V.; Dais, Dimitrios I. (1996). "Strong McKay correspondence, string-theoretic Hodge numbers and mirror symmetry". Topology. 35 (4): 901–929. arXiv:alg-geom/9410001. doi:10.1016/0040-9383(95)00051-8. S2CID 15604511.
- Batyrev, Victor V. (1998). "Stringy Hodge numbers of varieties with Gorenstein canonical singularities". Integrable systems and algebraic geometry (Kobe/Kyoto, 1997). River Edge, NJ: World Sci. Publ. pp. 1–32. arXiv:alg-geom/9711008. ISBN 981-02-3266-7. MR 1672108.
- Batyrev, Victor V.; Tschinkel, Yuri (1998). "Manin's conjecture for toric manifolds". Journal of Algebraic Geometry. 7: 15–53. arXiv:alg-geom/9510014. Bibcode:1995alg.geom.10014B.
