= Ca' Vendramin Calergi =

15th-century Venetian palace

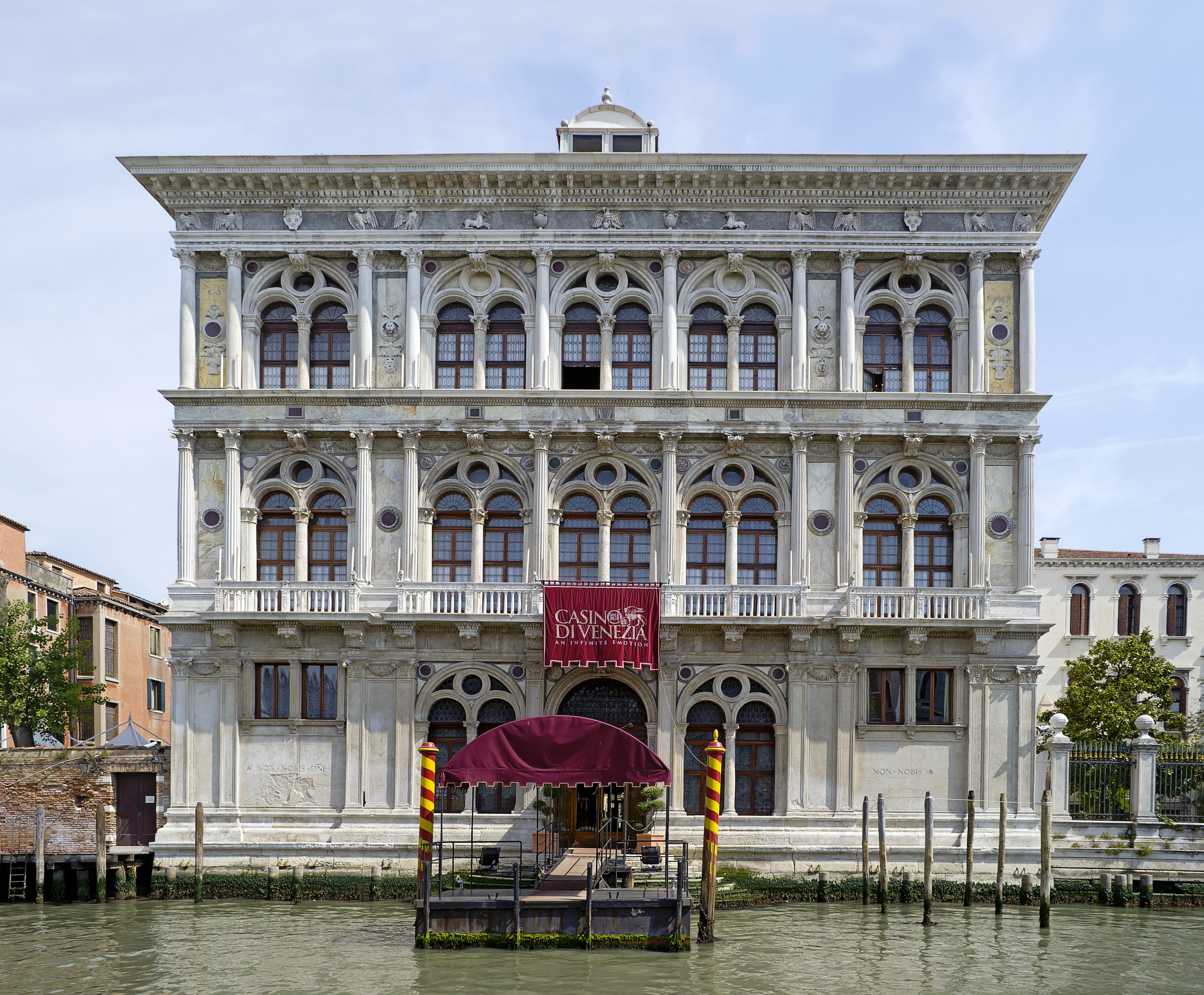
- Ca' Vendramin Calergi on the Grand Canal
- Click on the map for a fullscreen view
- Alternative names: Ca' Loredan Vendramin Calergi
- Etymology: by the Loredan, Vendramin, and Calergi families

General information
- Coordinates: 45°26′32″N 12°19′47″E
- Construction started: 1481
- Construction stopped: 1509
- Cost: 200,000 ducats
- Owner: Casino of Venice SpA

Design and construction
- Architect: Mauro Codussi
- Developer: Andrea Loredan

Ca' Loredan Vendramin Calergi is a 15th-century Renaissance palace on the Grand Canal in the sestiere (quarter) of Cannaregio in Venice, Italy. It was commissioned by the patrician Loredan dynasty, namely Andrea Loredan, and paid for by Doge Leonardo Loredan. The Loredan family spent an enormous sum of more than 200 thousand ducats on its construction, which started in 1481 and ended in 1509. The architecturally distinguished building was the home of many prominent people through history and was the place where composer Richard Wagner died.

Today, it houses the Venice Casino (Casinò di Venezia) and the Wagner Museum (Museo Wagner).

== History ==
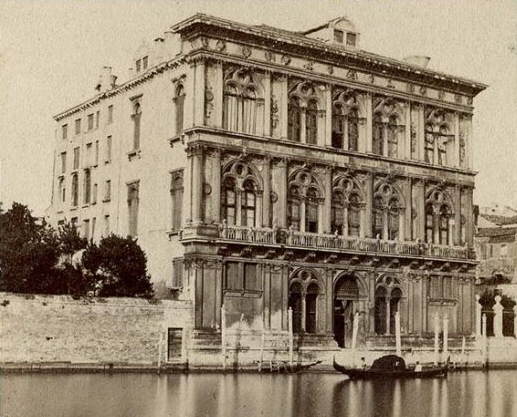
Ca' Vendramin Calergi in 1870, photograph by Carlo Naya inscribed to Marie-Caroline de Bourbon-Sicile, duchess de Berry (1798–1870), its former owner.

Ca' Vendramin Calergi was designed in the late 15th century by Mauro Codussi, architect of Chiesa di San Zaccaria and other noteworthy churches and private residences in Venice. Construction began in 1481 and was finished after his death by the Lombardo family of architects, who completed it in 1509. The twenty-eight-year period it took to complete construction is considered short based on the technology available at that time.

The spacious Renaissance-style palace stands three stories high with direct access to the Grand Canal available by gondolas. The beauty and balance of the building's façade are exceptional. Classically inspired columns divide each level facing the canal. Two pairs of tall French doors divided by a single column topped by arches and a trefoil window rest above the doors on the piano nobile and upper levels. Opulent paintings, sculptures, and architectural details originally filled the building's interior. Baroque master Mattia Bortoloni decorated the ceilings of many rooms. The palace is locally known by the nickname "Non Nobis Domine" ("Not unto us, O Lord"), which is engraved in the stone under a ground-floor window, and which is considered the motto of the Loredan family.

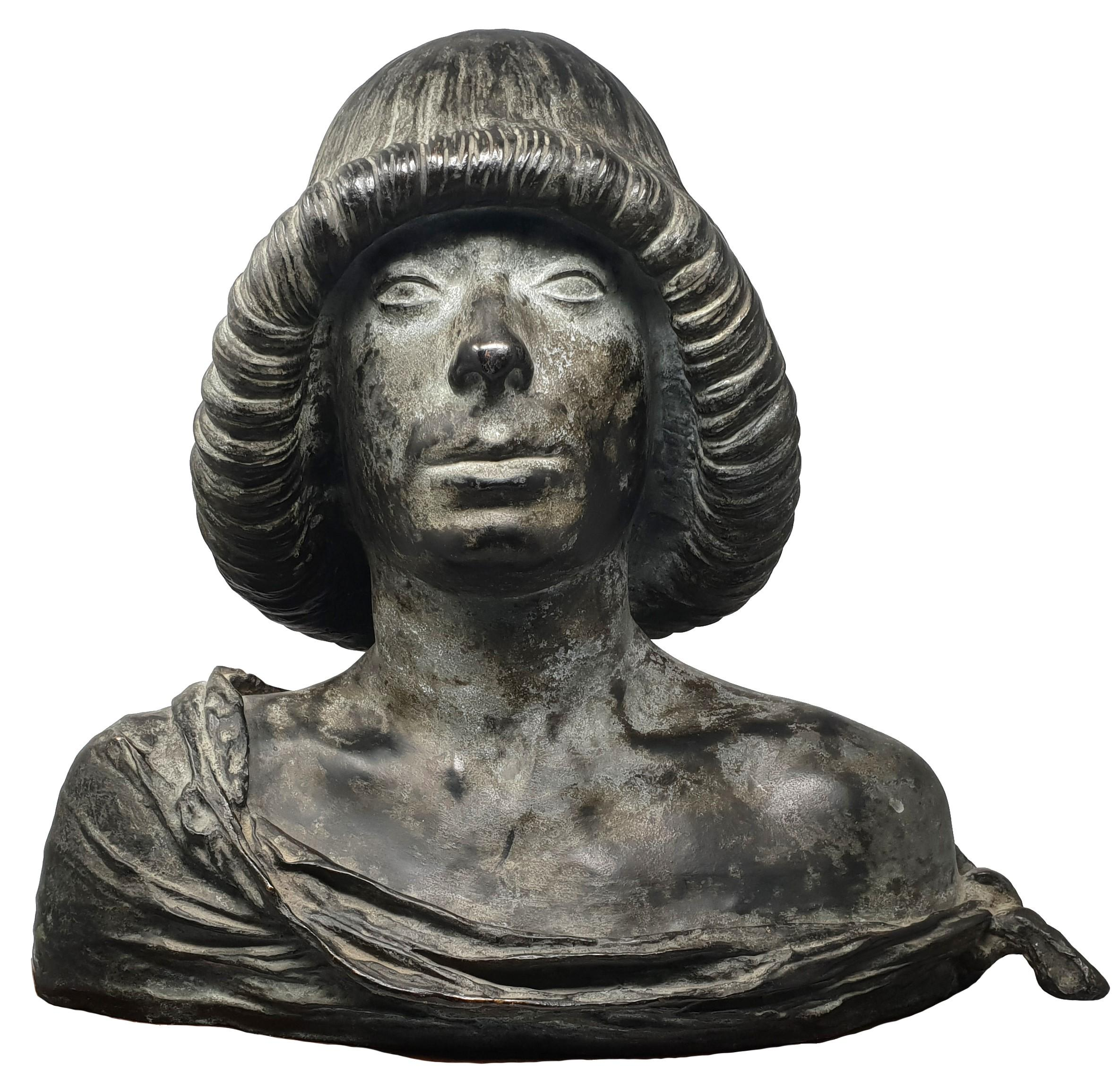
Bust of Andrea Loredan, by Antonio Rizzo, Museo Correr. Andrea was the commissioner of the palace and used it to host meetings of the Order of Venice.

Andrea Loredan, a connoisseur of the fine arts, commissioned the palace, which was paid for by the doge, Leonardo Loredan. In 1581, the Loredan heirs of Andrea sold it for 50,000 ducats to Eric II, Duke of Brunswick-Lüneburg who took loans to afford it and to host sumptuous dinners for the Venetian nobility. However, the duke kept it for only two years before selling it to Guglielmo I Gonzaga, Duke of Mantua, who then sold it to Vittore Calergi, a Venetian noble from Heraklion on the island of Crete. Calergi greatly expanded the building in 1614 with a large addition by architect Vincenzo Scamozzi called the "White Wing" which included windows overlooking a garden courtyard. The addition was demolished in 1659 and rebuilt the following year. In 1739, the palace was inherited through marriage by the Vendramins, a powerful patrician family of merchants, bankers, religious leaders, and politicians, who owned it for more than a century.

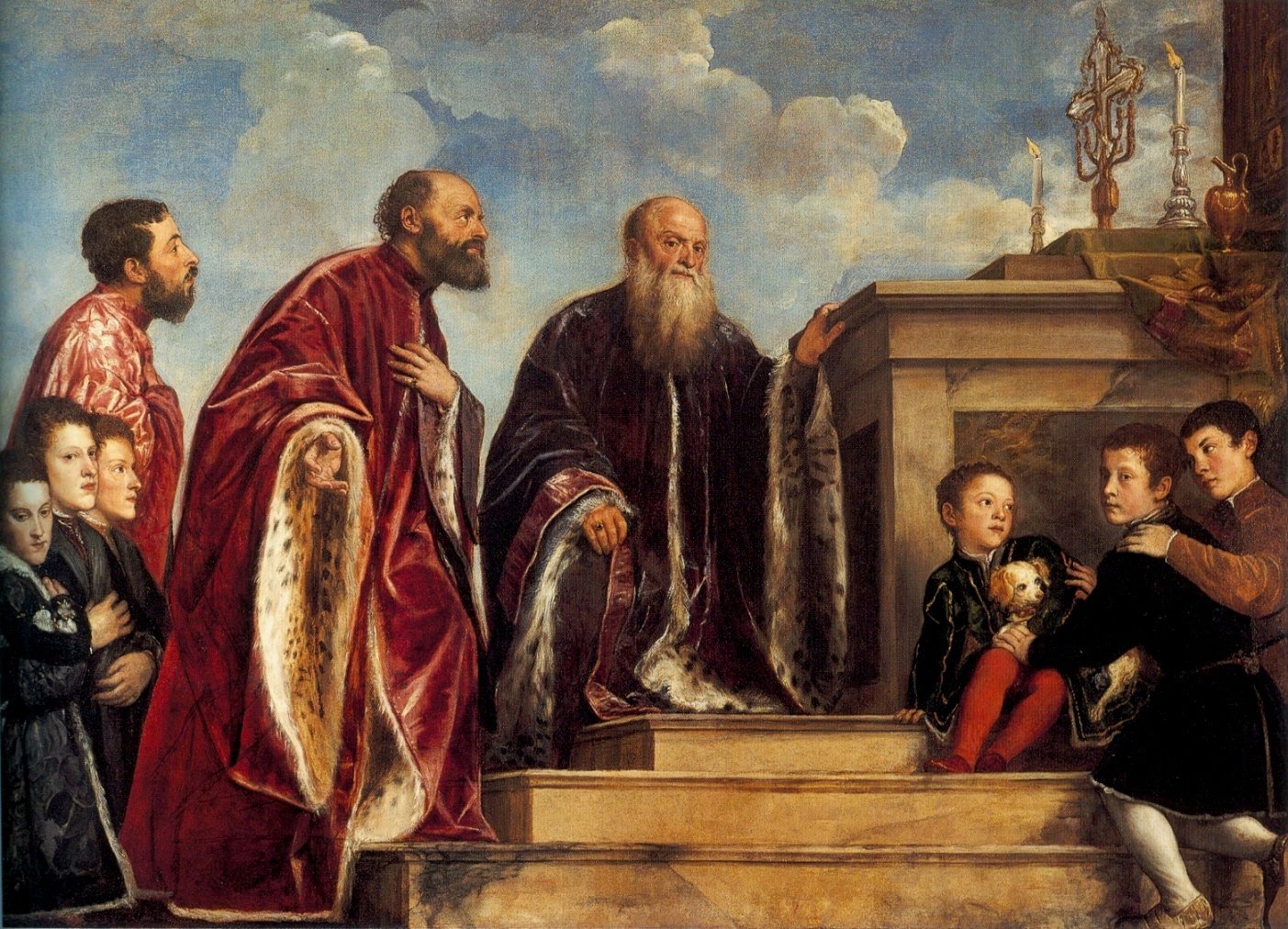
Portrait of the Vendramin Family (1543–47), painting by Titian.

In 1844, Marie-Caroline de Bourbon-Sicile, Duchess of Berry, and her second husband, Ettore Carlo Lucchesi-Palli, Duke della Grazia, purchased Ca' Vendramin Calergi from the last member of the Vendramin family line. In the turmoil of the Risorgimento, they were forced to sell the palace to Caroline's grandson, Henry (Enrico), Count de' Bardi, and many of its fine works of art were auctioned in Paris. Count de' Bardi and his wife Infanta Adelgundes and the related Dukes of Grazia maintained the home and hosted many famous names of the day. In 1937, the last of the Grazia nobles, Count Lucchesi-Palli, sold it to Giuseppe Volpi, Count of Misurata, who remodeled the living quarters and turned it into a Center for Electromagnetic and Electrical Phenomena.

The City Council of Venice purchased Ca' Vendramin Calergi in 1946. Since 1959, it has been the winter home to the celebrated Venice Casino (Casinò di Venezia).

== Wagner Museum ==
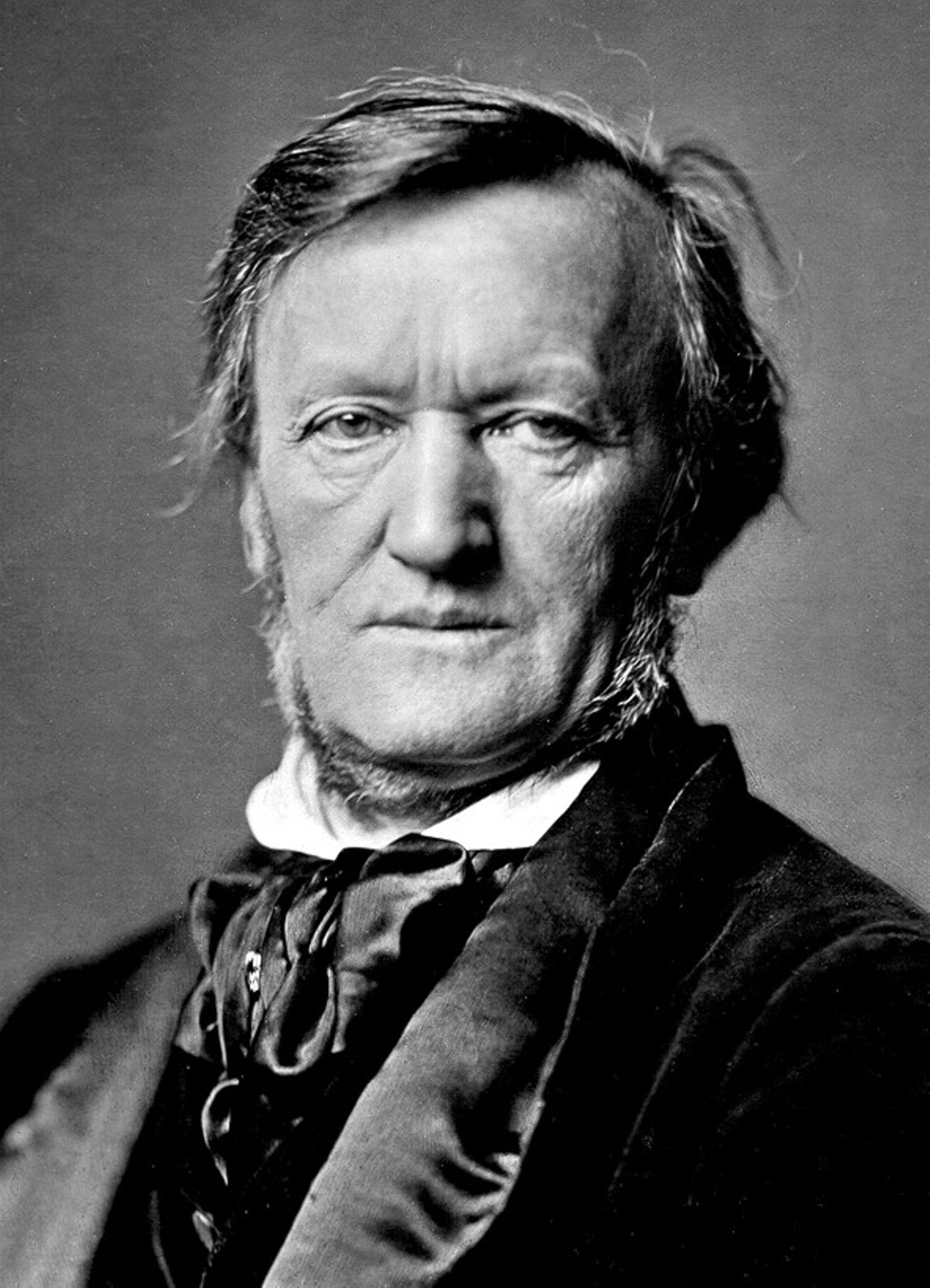
Richard Wagner in 1871

The composer Richard Wagner stayed in Venice six times between 1858 and his death. He arrived in Italy on his final trip not long after performances of his opera Parsifal premiered at the second Bayreuth Festival. He rented the entire piano nobile (mezzanine) level of the Ca' Vendramin Calergi from Count de' Bardi before his departure and arrived on 16 September 1882 with his wife Cosima Liszt, four children (Daniela von Bülow, Isolde, Eva and Siegfried Wagner) and household servants.

Wagner died of a heart attack in the palace on the afternoon of 13 February 1883 at age 69. A memorial plaque on a brick wall adjacent to the building is inscribed with a tribute by novelist and poet Gabriele d'Annunzio that reads:

In questo palagio / l'ultimo spiro di Riccardo Wagner / odono le anime perpetuarsi come la marea / che lambe i marmi

The Wagner Museum (Museo Wagner) opened at the palace in February 1995. It holds the Josef Lienhart Collection of rare documents, musical scores, signed letters, paintings, records and other heirlooms. The holdings constitute the largest private collection dedicated to Wagner outside of Bayreuth. The museum is open to the public on Saturday mornings by appointment.

The Associazione Richard Wagner di Venezia operates the museum as well as the Richard Wagner European Study and Research Center (Centro Europeo di Studi e Ricerche Richard Wagner – C.E.S.R.R.W.). It also holds exhibitions, conferences and concerts, and publishes scholarly papers that promote the life and works of Wagner.

The International Association of Wagner Societies also holds a symposium called "Wagner Days in Venice" (Giornate Wagneriane a Venezia) at the palace each autumn.

== See also ==
- List of music museums
- List of buildings and structures in Venice

== Notes ==
Preceded by Ca' Rezzonico	Venice landmarks Ca' Vendramin Calergi	Succeeded by Doge's Palace
