= Andrea Loredan =

Venetian nobleman

- Count of Brescia
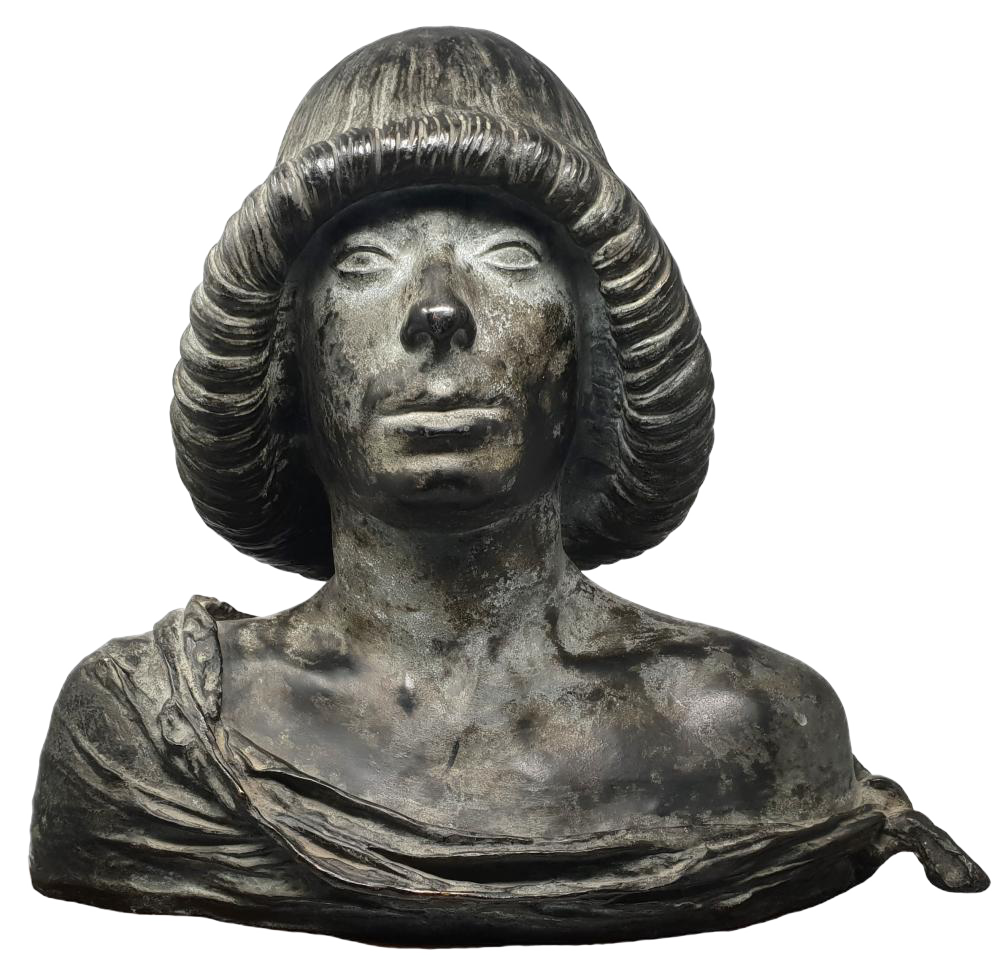
- Bust of Andrea Loredan, by Antonio Rizzo, Museo Correr
- Known for: commissioning the Ca' Loredan Vendramin Calergi
- Born: 1450; Venice, Republic of Venice
- Died: 1513 (aged 62–63); Creazzo, Republic of Venice
- Cause of death: beheaded in the Battle of La Motta
- Buried: Loredan Chapel
- Residence: Ca' Loredan Vendramin Calergi
- Offices: Senate; Council of Ten; Avogadoria de Comùn; Savi del Consiglio; Savi di Terraferma
- Noble family: House of Loredan
- Spouse: Maria Badoer (d. 1530s)
- Heir: Andrea di Alvise Loredan (d. 1556)
- Father: Nicolò di Antonio di Daniele Loredan
- Memorials: Bust of Andrea Loredan

Andrea Loredan (1450–1513) was a Venetian nobleman of the Loredan family, and the owner of one of the most prominent private art collections of his time. He was the first patron of the likes of Titian and Sebastiano del Piombo; some of their earliest masterpieces were commissioned for Andrea's palace on the Grand Canal, the Ca' Loredan Vendramin Calergi, which was designed by Mauro Codussi and paid for by Andrea's cousin, Doge Leonardo Loredan. Andrea is also notable for commissioning the choir of the church of San Michele in Isola, also designed by Codussi.

In 1513, during the War of the League of Cambrai, he had to accept the role of quartermaster-general for the army, which had closed ranks near Vicenza. Andrea Loredan died in the Battle of La Motta in that same year, beheaded by two soldiers who fought over his body. Loved and respected in Venice, the news of his death brought great sadness to the city. In 1581, his heirs obtained permission from the Council of Ten to sell off the Palace to the Duke of Brunswick for fifty thousand ducats. The Duke had to take loans to be able to afford the grand residence.

The Bust of Andrea Loredan, which is today featured in the Museo Correr, was sculptured by Antonio Rizzo, one of the greatest architects and sculptors of the Venetian Renaissance. Joseph Lindon Smith depicted the bust in one of his paintings, which is today kept in the Harvard Art Museums.

== Biography ==
Andrea's career can be followed from the Venetian diarist and historian Marino Sanudo’s writings and from archival sources. Although he never became doge, Loredan attained the most prestigious titles in the Venetian government during his lifetime, beginning in the 1490s with his election to the Senate and appointment as the state’s attorney. In 1502 he was elected Wise Man of the Terraferma and relocated to Brescia in Lombardy to take up duties as podestà (chief magistrate) and rettore (Venetian delegate for economic and military matters) in the city. Andrea’s success in this role led to his re-election as podestà in Brescia, in which office he served in 1503 and 1504. The following year he was first elected Wise Man of the Council on the judicial board of the Venetian government, and then attained the position of head of the Council of Ten, a role to which he also held later in 1510 and 1511–12.

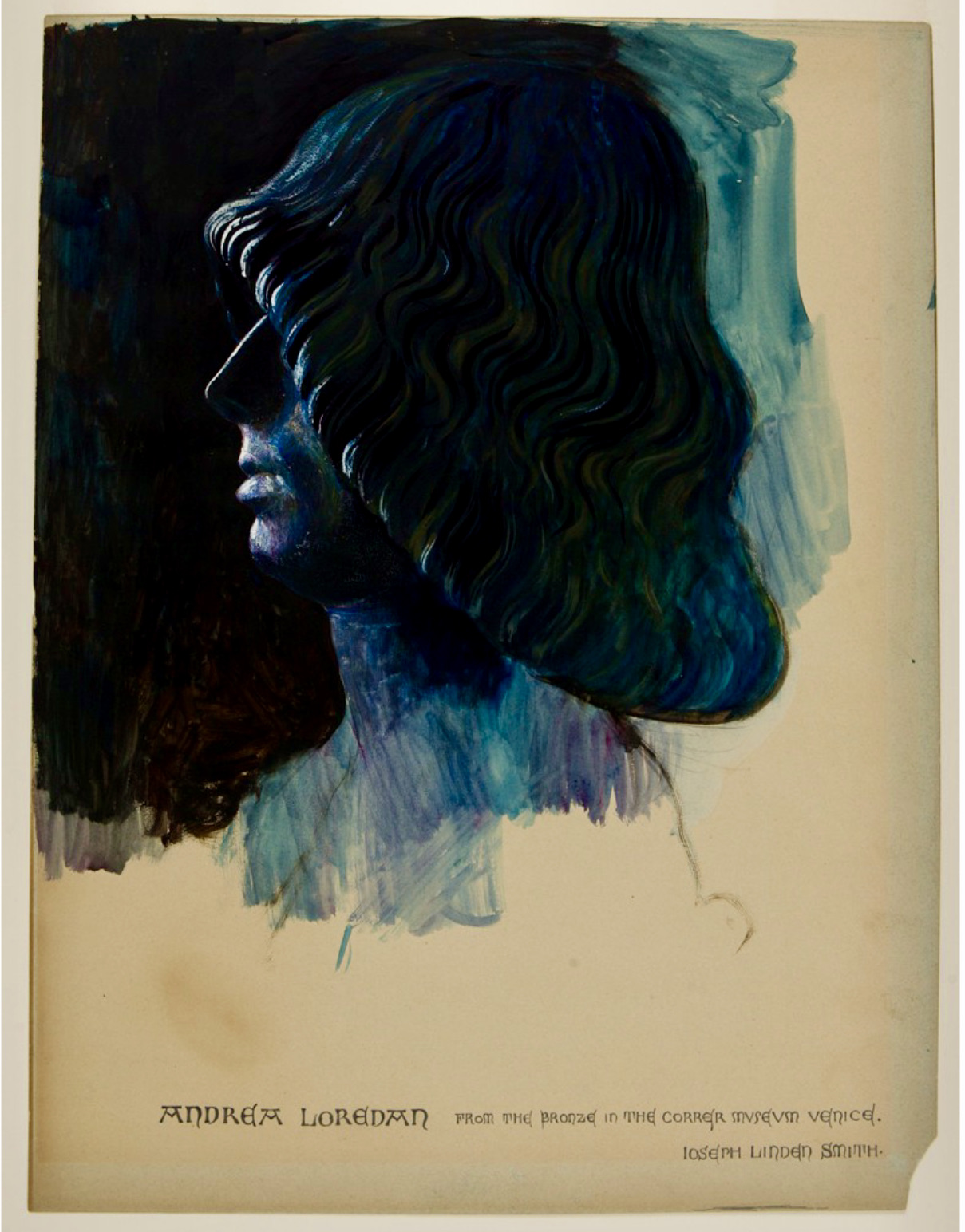
Painting of Andrea Loredan, by Joseph Lindon Smith, Harvard Art Museums

Just before the War of the League of Cambrai, in which Venice was led by Andrea's cousin, Doge Leonardo Loredan, he was dispatched to the city of Udine in Friuli in 1507 as a lieutenant, but refused the Senate’s request to return there in 1509. This notorious objection led to his enforced temporary retirement to the island of Mazzorbo in the Venetian Lagoon, ‘in a most esteemed residence, living very honourably, because he was rich’. He soon returned to favour, and served the first of two terms as sopragastaldo (judicial magistrate), and again on the Council of Ten in 1509–10. In 1513, as provveditore generale of the entire terraferma, he was ordered by the Senate to join the Venetian army encamped near Vicenza to rally a defence against invading Spanish and German troops. It was owing to the dangerous nature of this assignment that Loredan hastily made his will in June 1513. His fears were soon realized, for he was beheaded and died in the Battle of La Motta at Creazzo outside Vicenza several months later. According to his last wishes, he was buried in the cappella maggiore of the church of San Michele in Isola whose construction he had helped to finance.

In 1568, following lengthy negotiations with Andrea's heirs, Albert V of Bavaria finally purchased a substantial amount of the coveted art collection: 120 bronzes, 2,480 medals and coins, 91 marble heads, 43 marble statues, 33 reliefs and 14 various curiosities, for the sum of 7,000 ducats; "they were all exported from Venice secretly at night in large chests". Most of the pieces are now displayed in the Antiquarium at Munich Residenz, built specifically to house the impressive collection.
