= Battle of La Motta (1513) =

Part of the War of the League of Cambrai

- Part of the War of the League of Cambrai
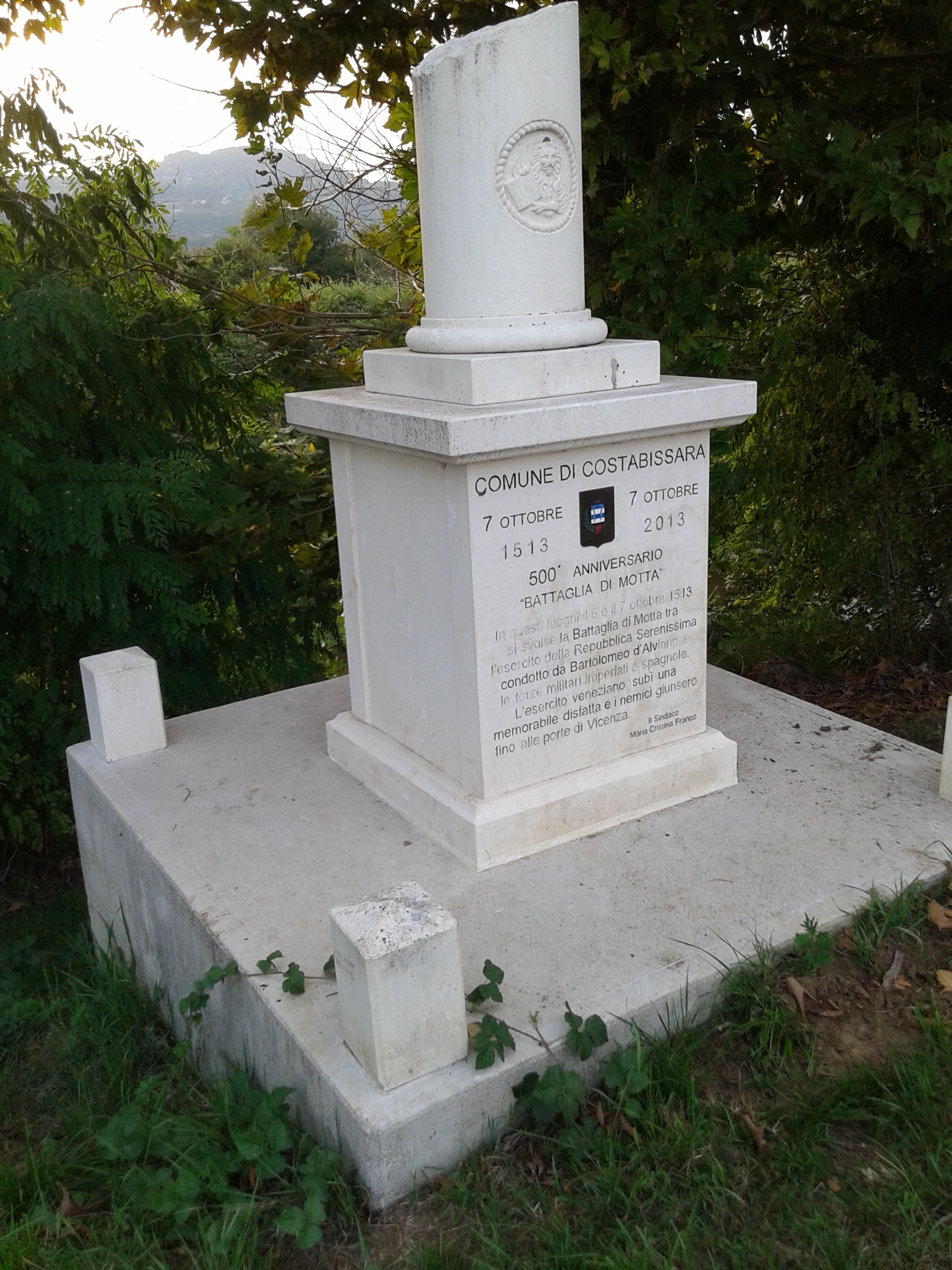
- Commemorative monument for the battle of La Motta
Date	7 October 1513
Location	Schio, Veneto, Republic of Venice (present-day Italy) 45°35′48″N 11°29′19″E
Result	Spanish and Imperial victory

Belligerents
Spain; Holy Roman Empire	Republic of Venice

Commanders and leaders
Ramón de Cardona; Prospero Colonna; Fernando d'Ávalos; Georg von Frundsberg	Bartolomeo d'Alviano; Gian Paolo Baglioni (POW); Gian Paolo Manfrone; Antonio Pio †; Mercurio Bua

Strength
4,000 Spanish infantry; 3,500 Imperial landsknechts; 1,000 Spanish cavalry; 32 guns	10,000 infantry; 3,000 cavalry; 24 guns

Casualties and losses
Unknown, but minor	Over 4,500 casualties

The Battle of La Motta, also known as the Battle of Schio, Battle of Vicenza or Battle of Creazzo, took place at Schio, in the Italian region of Veneto, Republic of Venice, on 7 October 1513, between the forces of the Republic of Venice and a combined force of Spain and the Holy Roman Empire, and was a significant battle of the War of the League of Cambrai. A Venetian army under Bartolomeo d'Alviano was decisively defeated by the Spanish/Imperial army commanded by Ramón de Cardona and Fernando d'Ávalos.

== Background ==
The Venetian commander, Bartolomeo d'Alviano, unexpectedly left without French support, retreated into the region of Veneto, pursued closely by the Spanish army under Ramón de Cardona. While the Spanish were unable to capture Padua, they penetrated deep into Venetian territory and in September were in sight of Venice itself. The Spanish Viceroy of Naples, Ramón de Cardona, attempted a bombardment of the city that proved largely ineffective; then, having no ships with which to cross the lagoon, turned back for Lombardy. D'Alviano, having been reinforced by hundreds of soldiers and volunteers from the Venetian nobility, and cannons and other supplies, took the initiative and pursued Cardona's army, with the intention of not allowing the Spaniards out of the region of Veneto. Calling the army of Gian Paolo Baglioni in his help, he sent Gian Paolo Manfrone to gather a militia with local villagers and shepherds.

== Previous movements ==
Cardona found D'Alviano blocking his path at the other side of the Brenta river, which the Venetians had fortified. However, the Spanish viceroy found a detour and crossed the river from another point while distracting the Venetians with a feint. When D'Alviano realized the ruse, he fell back to Vicenza, where he reunited with the allied army of Gian Paolo Baglioni and built a series of fortifications in Olmo to block their path again in route to Verona. D'Alviano planned to force Cardona to either engage him directly or take another detour through the mountain of Bassano, where he would be easy prey to Venetian guerrilla.

Cardona camped near Vicenza, harassed by the Venetian artillery, which forced his men to sleep without tents and cover their train behind the forests. The arrival of Manfrone's militia further cornered them from the back. Cardona and his captains then decided to retreat towards Bassano as D'Alviano expected, yet planned to circle around it and head to Trento, hoping to force Alviano into either pursuing them or letting them return safely to Verona through the detour. Colonna, the most experienced general, asked and received command of the Imperial rear guard, where the pursuers would hit them. Capitalizing on a dense fog bank, the Imperials collected their camp and advanced quietly towards Schio.

D'Alviano was reluctant to give chase, being unsure of the enemy movements and not wanting to commit a faux pas, but upon greater pressure from Venetian quartermaster-general Andrea Loredan, he eventually gave the order. He reached Cardona in the plains of Vicenza near Motta de Costabissara, where he found the Imperials in square formation ready to clash from the back.

== Battle ==
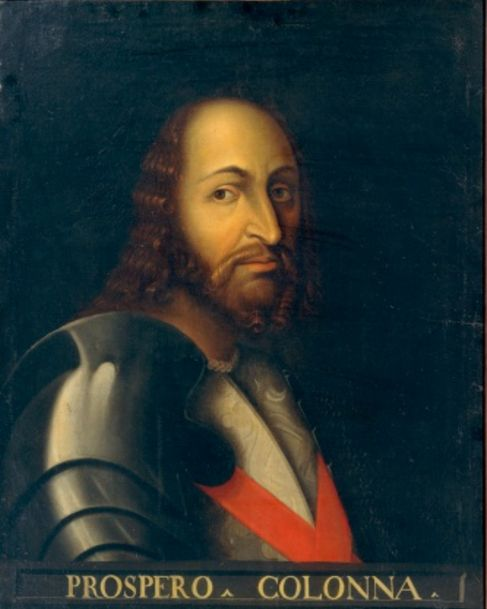
Portrait of Prospero Colonna, commander of the Spanish infantry.

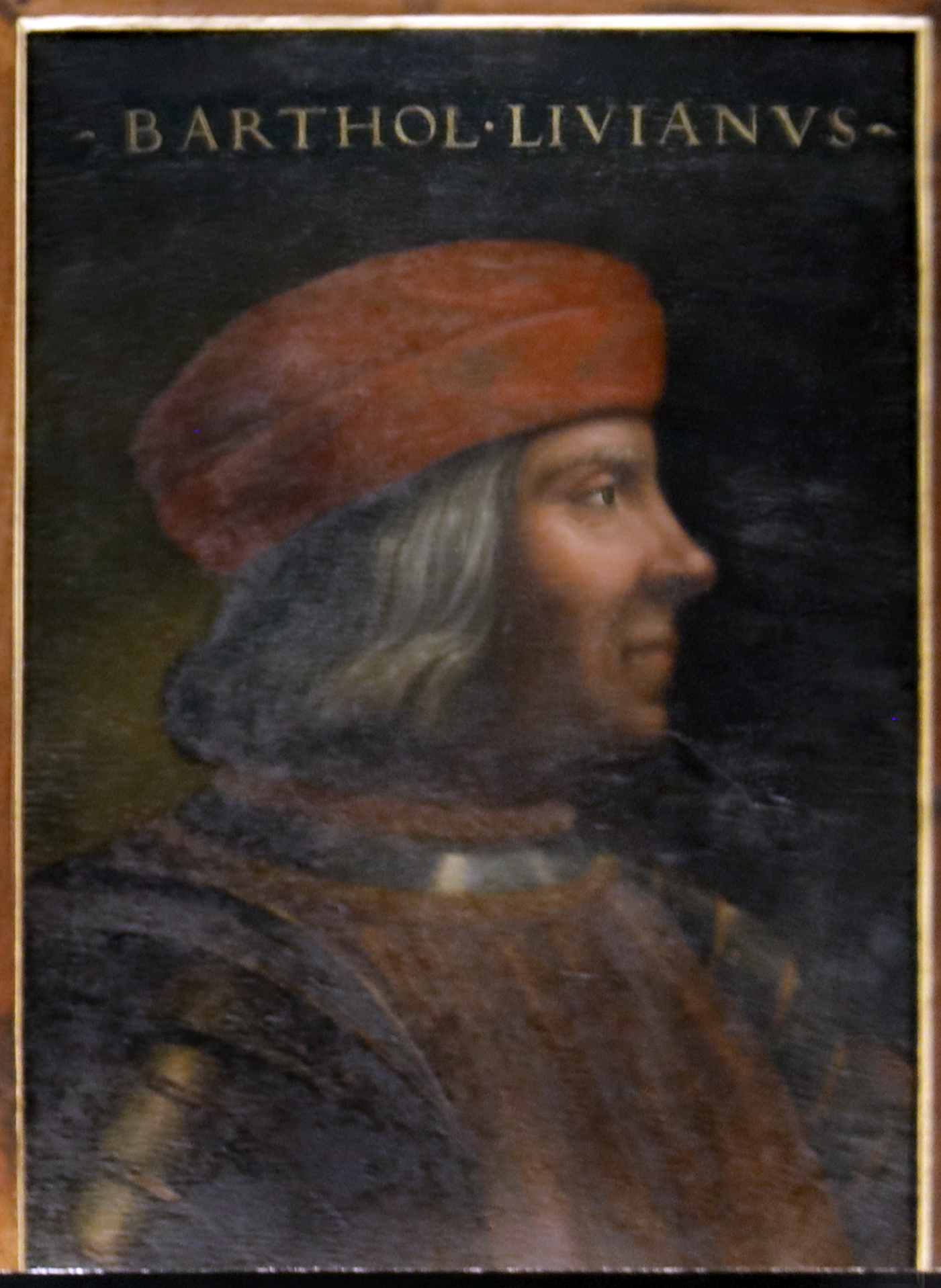
Portrait of Bartolomeo d'Alviano, who commanded the Venetian army.

D'Alviano launched a first cavalry charge against the enemy rear guard, but upon being routed by the Imperial German cavalry, he ordered an all out attack, seeking to prevent them from capitalizing on the momentary advantage. He placed himself and Antonio Pio in the lead while he ordered Baglioni to outflank the Imperial army with his cavalry from the left. The German cavalry was now overpowered and let into the square, where the Spanish ordered the army to stop and reverse their march towards the enemy. Their first line was captained by Hernando de Alarcón, Troilo Savelli and Prospero's cousin Muzio Colonna.

Battle raged evenly matched, with D'Alviano and Prospero Colonna leading very close from the opposite lines. However, when Colonna ordered a double attack with his coronelías under Fernando d'Ávalos and the landsknechts under Jakob von Landau, the Venetian line completely collapsed. Pio's companies threw down their arms and routed, with their captain falling in the Bacchiglione river and drowning, while the companies under D'Alviano himself were decimated and his own standardbearers killed. Baglioni failed to join the battle, as he had chosen a swampy road in his rush to flank the Imperials and could not approach them in time. Seeing the battle lost, D'Alviano finally called to retreat and fled.

The Spaniards and Italians allowed the Venetians to retreat, but the Germans, who still remembered their defeat to D'Alviano in the Battle of Cadore, executed without quarter all the Venetians they could seize, including Loredan. The result of the day was the practical destruction of the Venetian army, with 4.500-5,000 being killed and the rest becoming scattered. Twenty four artillery pieces were captured. The citizens of Vicenza then closed the gates to their own countrymen, fearing Imperial retaliation if they let them inside, forcing D'Alviano to return directly to Padua.

== Consequences ==
Although the Venetians were decisively defeated by the Spaniards, the Holy League failed to follow up on these victories. The forces of the two commanders continued to skirmish in the Italy's most North-Eastern region of Friuli-Venezia Giulia for the rest of 1513 and through 1514.

The death of the King of France, Louis XII, on 1 January 1515, brought Francis I to the throne. Having assumed the title of Duke of Milan at his coronation, Francis immediately moved to reclaim his holdings in Italy. A combined Swiss and Papal force moved north from Milan to block the Alpine passes against him, but Francis avoided the main passes and marched instead through the valley of the Stura. The French vanguard surprised the Milanese cavalry at Villafranca, capturing Prospero Colonna. Meanwhile, Francis and the main body of the French confronted the Swiss at the Battle of Marignano on 13 September.

== See also ==
- War of the League of Cambrai
- Battle of Marignano
- Italian Wars
- List of battles of the Italian Wars

== Sources ==
- Dalla-Cà, Alessandro (1904). Costabissara, memorie storiche. Schio.
- Norwich, John Julius. A History of Venice. New York: Vintage Books (1989) ISBN 0-679-72197-5.
- Kamen, Henry. Empire: How Spain Became a World Power 1492–1763. New York: HarperCollins (2003) ISBN 0-06-019476-6.
- Taylor, Frederick Lewis. The Art of War in Italy 1494–1529. Cambridge University Press, 1921. Westport: Greenwood Press (1973) ISBN 0-8371-5025-6.
- Montgomery, Bernard Law. A History of Warfare. New York: World Publishing Company (1968) ISBN 0-688-01645-6.
- Guicciardini, Francesco. The History of Italy. Translated by Sydney Alexander. Princeton: Princeton University Press (1984) ISBN 0-691-00800-0.
- Mallet, Michael and Shaw, Christine. The Italian Wars 1494–1559. Harlow: Pearson Educated Limited (2012) ISBN 978-0-582-05758-6.
- Sandoval, Prudencio (1614). Historia de la Vida y hechos del emperador Carlos V.
- Baumann, Reinhard. Georg von Frundsberg. München: Süddeutscher Verlag (1984) ISBN 3-7991-6236-4.
