= Saccardo =

- Pier Andrea Saccardo (23 April 1845 in Treviso, Treviso – 12 February 1920 in Padua) was an Italian botanist and mycologist.
- Pietro Saccardo (Venice, September 28, 1830 – Chirignago, November 19, 1903) was an Italian architect.
- Tim Saccardo is a comedy writer and producer.
