= Irene Sloan =

American journalist

Irene Sloan (19 September 1942, Los Angeles — 20 May 2008, Woodland Hills, California) was an American music critic and journalist and the founder of the Wagner Society of Southern California. Along with her husband, Sherwin Sloan, she founded The Opera Quarterly in 1983. The Sloans oversaw the publication for the first six volumes (1983–89).
