= International Association of Wagner Societies =

International music organization

RWVI
- International Association of Wagner Societies
- Founded: 1991
- Headquarters: Bayreuth
- Location: Germany
- Members: 15,500
- Key people: Dr Harry Leutscher, President
- Affiliations: Bayreuth Festival
- Website: www.richard-wagner.org/rwvi/en/

The International Association of Wagner Societies (Der Richard-Wagner-Verband International e.V., also known as "Der RWVI") is an affiliation of Wagner societies (Richard Wagner-Verband) that promotes interest and research into the works of Richard Wagner, raises funds for scholarships for young music students, singers, and instrumentalists, and supports the annual Bayreuth Festival. It also sponsors symposia, holds singing competitions for Wagnerian voices, and issues awards for stage direction and stagings of Wagner's operas. The association is a nonprofit organization, governed by a Presidium headed by a President, who are elected together quinquennially.

== History ==
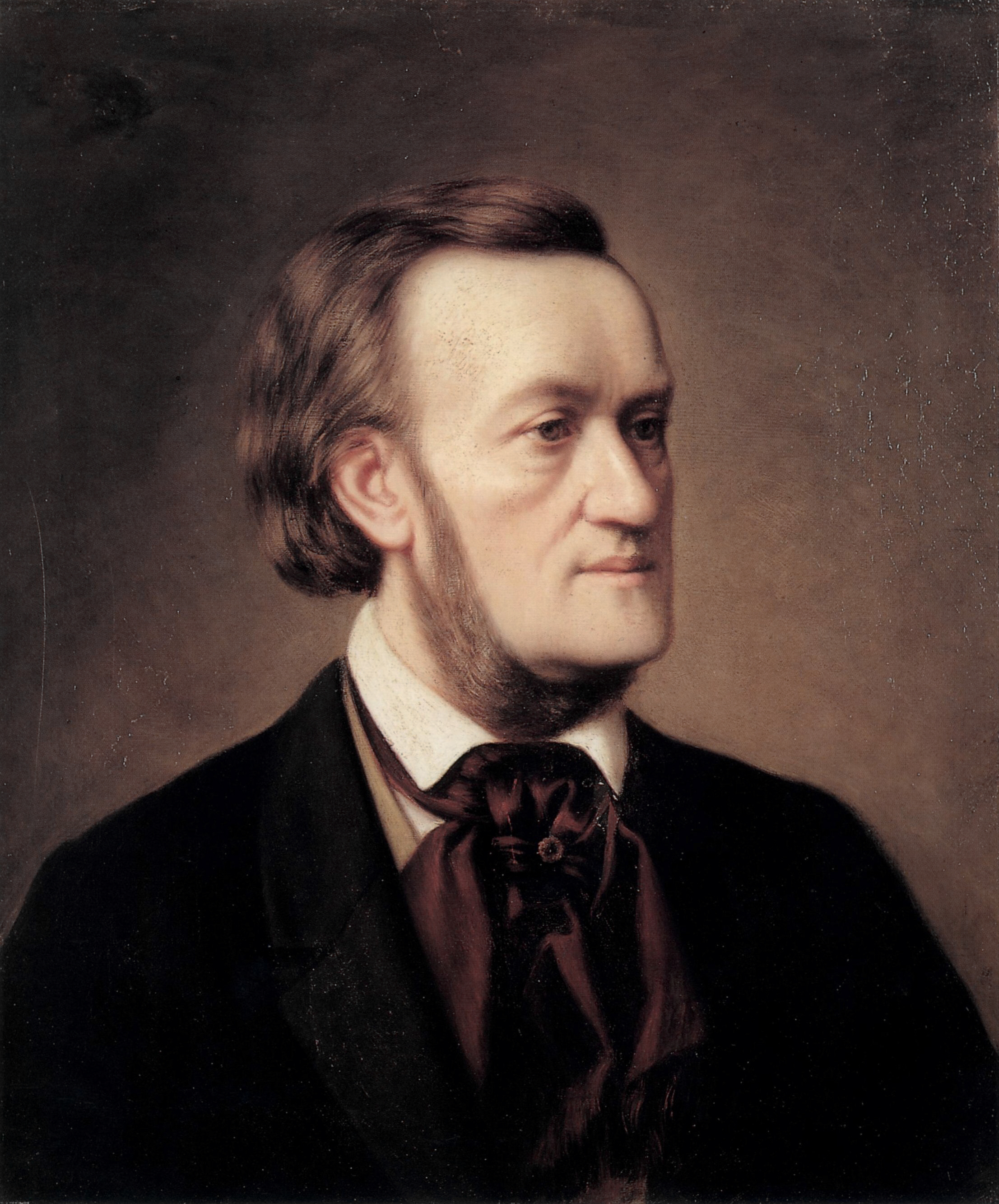
Richard Wagner (portrait by Cäsar Willich), c.1862

The first Richard Wagner society was launched in Mannheim, Germany in 1871, one year after the premiere of the German composer's opera Die Walküre ("The Valkyrie") in Munich. The brainchild of Wagner's longtime friend, the music publisher Emil Heckel, the first society was a simple, locally conceived venue for celebrating Wagner's music. In the wake of Wagner's difficulties in securing interest in the public subscription for his future Bayreuth Festival, Heckel suggested to the composer that he sponsor additional societies to help secure support. Wagner embraced the idea enthusiastically, and by 1872, societies had been established in Vienna, Berlin, Leipzig and London (the latter founded by Edward Dannreuther (1844–1905), the author of Richard Wagner: His Tendencies and Theories published in 1873).

Wagner's dream, as described in a letter written in 1882, was that his Bayreuth Festival would be free for everyone to attend, however this was never possible because of the extremely high costs to organize and produce it. Nonetheless, based on Wagner's desires, societies refocused their efforts and began making it possible for promising talented musicians to attend. Public interest in supporting subscriptions to fund scholarships was initially tepid, but from 1919 forward, the number of societies increased steadily.

The International Association of Wagner Societies was founded in 1991 in Lyon. Today, more than 15,500 members in 124 societies belong to the International Association of Wagner Societies around the globe. The number of groups under the organization's auspices has expanded considerably in the last fifty years. Wagner societies can be found in all parts of the world, including the Netherlands, Venice, Great Britain, Scotland, Shanghai, Tokyo, Lisbon, Melbourne, Adelaide, Ankara, New York City, Toronto, Cape Town, Bangkok, New Zealand, Puerto Rico, the Ottawa/Gatineau area, and since 1993, South Korea.

The societies are very diverse and offer a wide range of Wagner-related activities, including concerts, lectures, and publishing. The main organization holds a symposium called "Wagner Days in Venice" (Giornate Wagneriane a Venezia) in Italy each autumn.

== Presidium ==
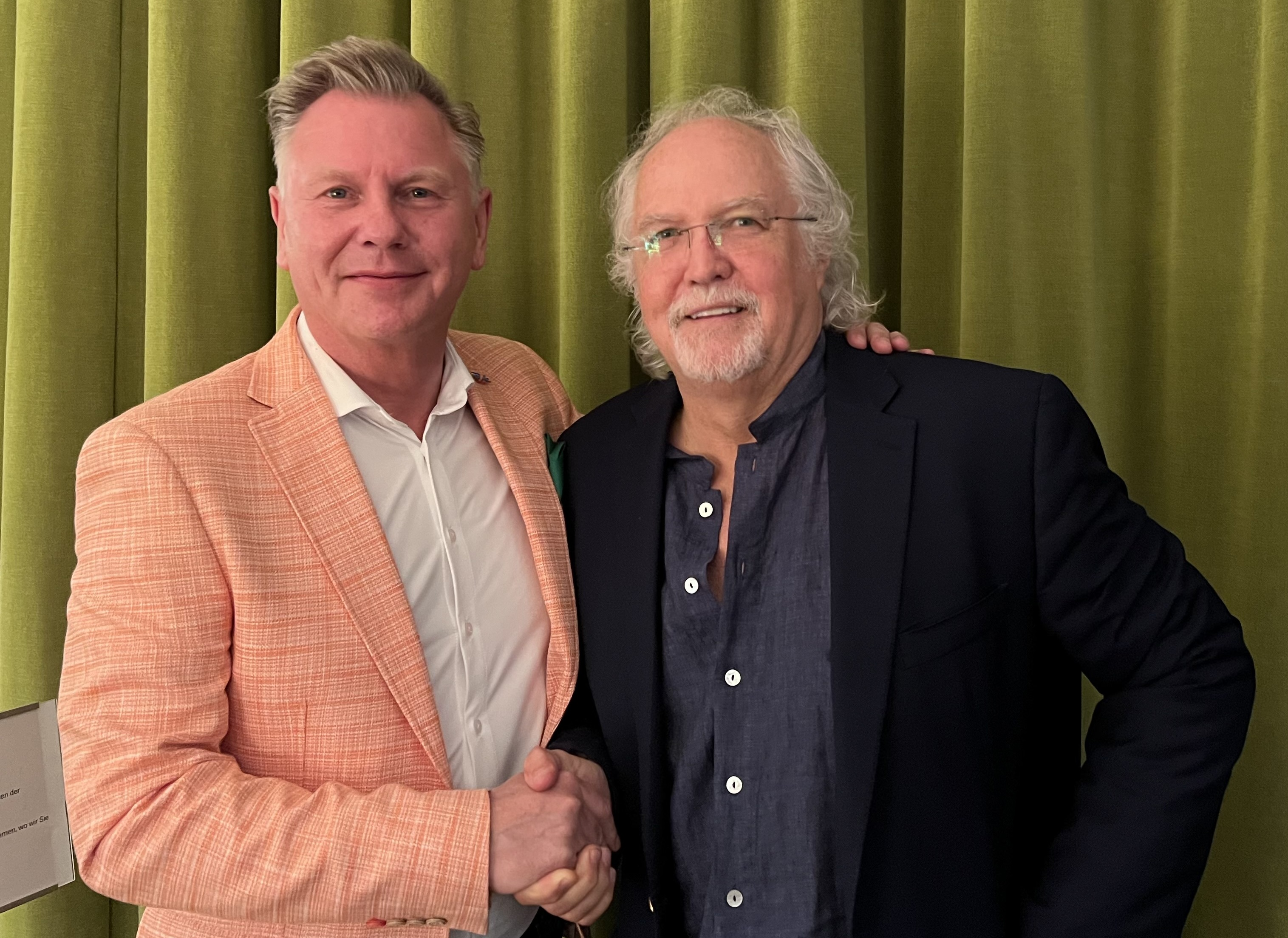
RWVI President Dr Harry Leutscher (left) at Deutsche Oper Berlin with conductor Sir Donald Runnicles

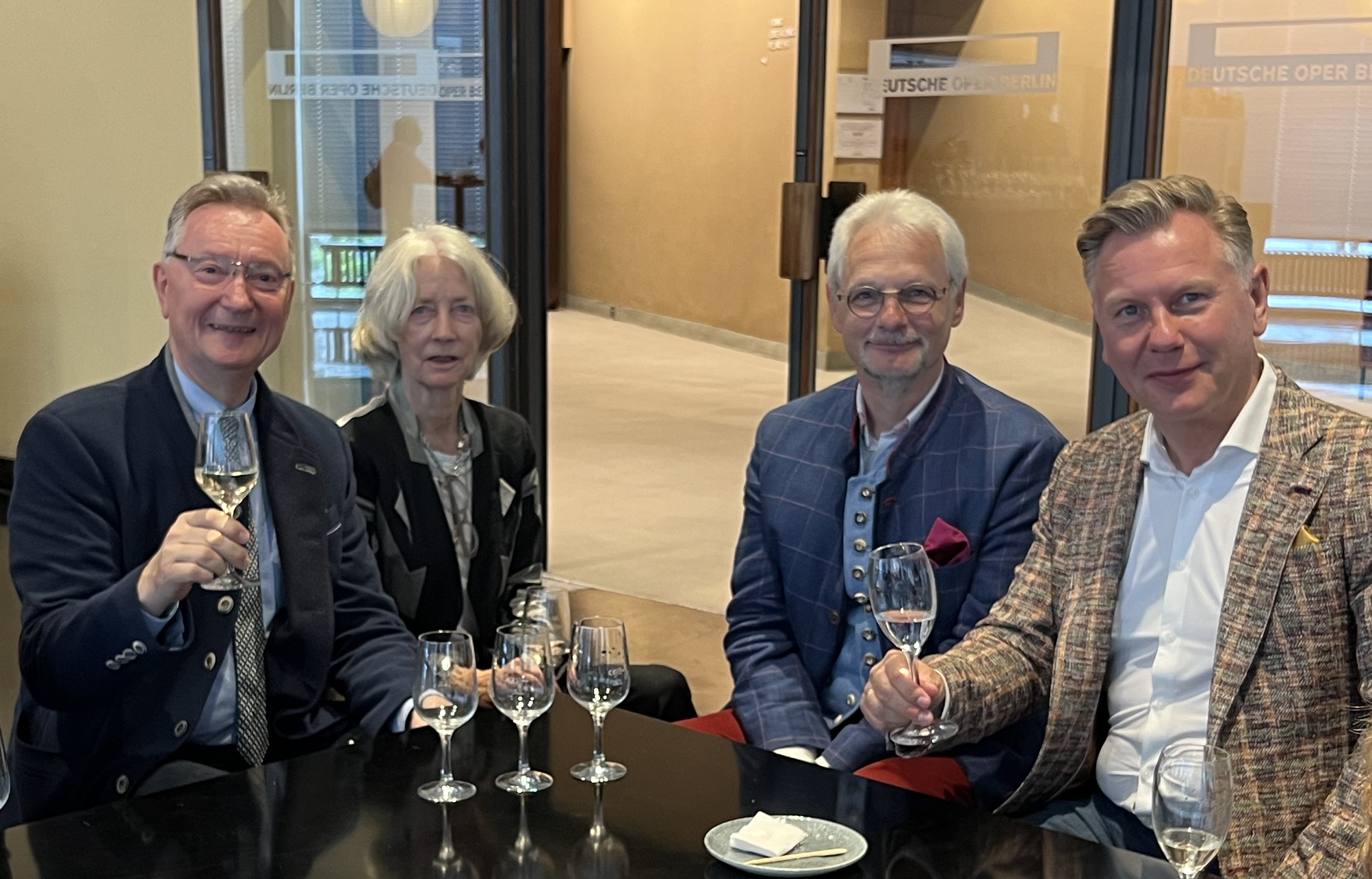
From left: outgoing RWVI President Rainer Fineske, Nike Wagner, Torsten Fineske, incoming RWVI President, Harry Leutscher

Current RWVI President

Elected for a five-year term by the 2024 Assembly of Delegates.

- Harry Leutscher (Netherlands), President
- Christian Stürzl-Moitz (Germany), First Vice President
- Esther Lobato (Spain), Second Vice President
- Ada Vermeer-Janse (Netherlands), Treasurer
- Elizabeth Mollard (Belgium), Secretary
- Karin Colpan (Germany), Assessor national
- Michael Schmidt (Germany), Assessor national
- Thomas Winiarski (Germany), Assessor national
- Selma Guðmundsdóttir (Iceland), Assessor international
- Cyril Plante (France), Assessor international
- Derek Williams (Scotland), Assessor international

== Presidents ==
- 2024–present: Harry Leutscher, Emmen
- 2019–2024: Rainer Fineske, Berlin
- 2015–2019: Horst Eggers, Bayreuth
- 2014–2015: Thomas Krakow, Leipzig
- 2008–2014: Eva Märtson, Hannover
- 1988–2008: Josef Lienhart, Freiburg i. Br. (1st President of RWVI)
- 1981–1988: Helmut Goldmann, Nürnberg
- 1968–1981: Mercedes Bahlsen, Hannover
- 1943–1968: Lotte Albrecht-Potonié, Hannover
- 1914–1943: Marianne Lange, Hannover
- 1909–1914: Margarethe Strauß, Magdeburg

== Richard Wagner International Congress ==
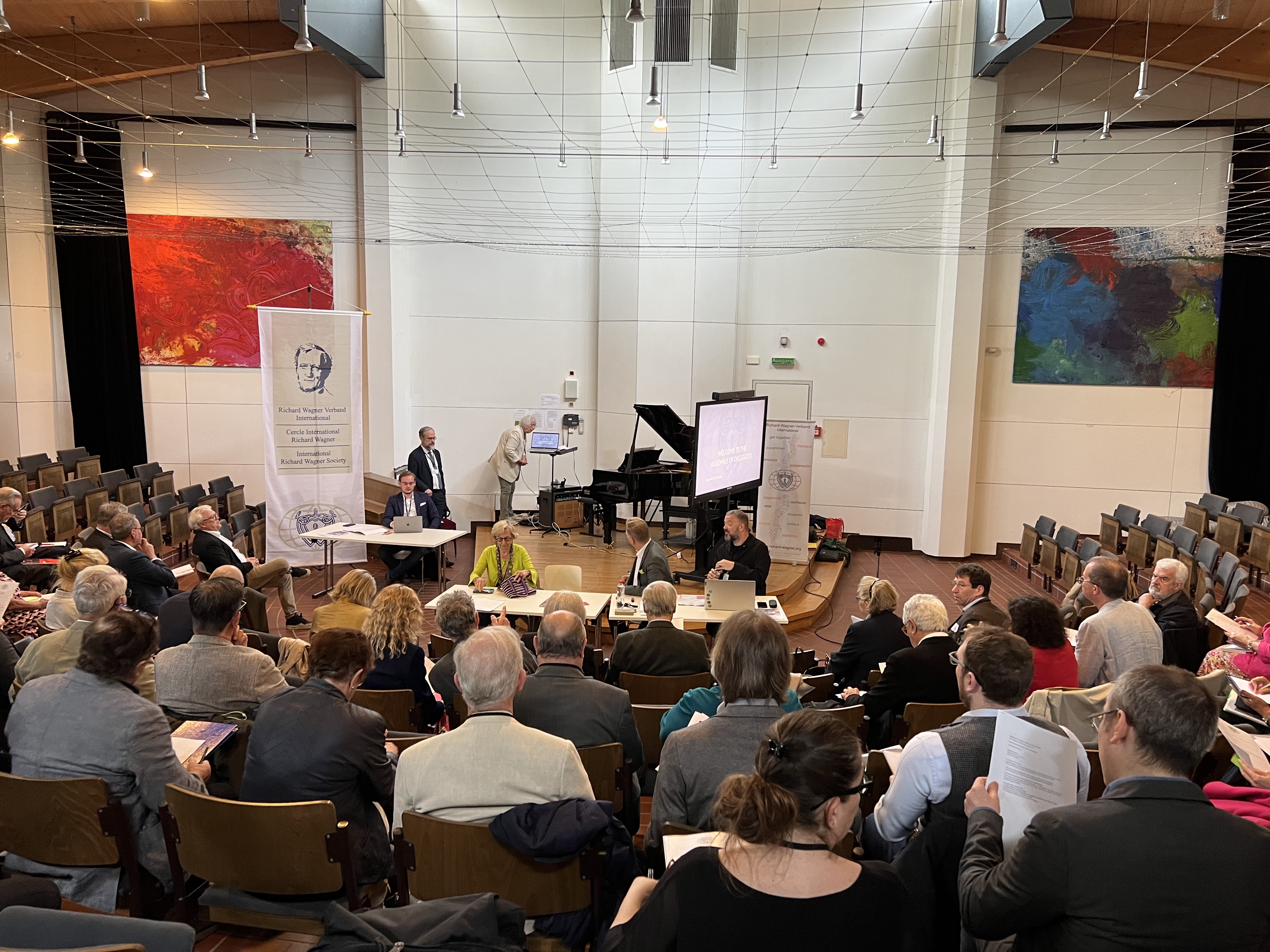
RWVI Assembly of Delegates, Bayreuth, May 2025 Chorsaal, Bayreuth Festspielhaus

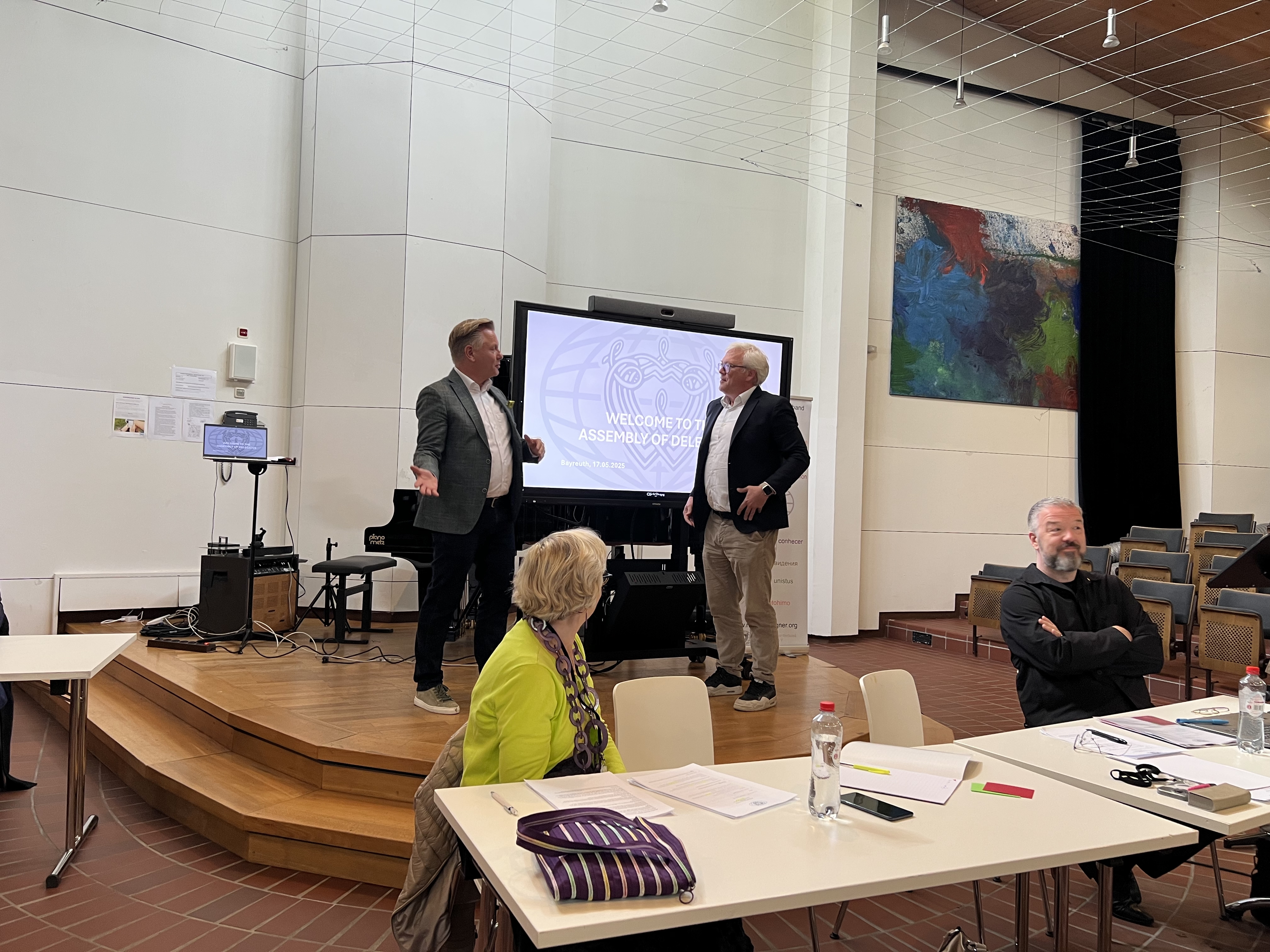
RWVI President Harry Leutscher and Bayreuth Commercial Director Ulrich Jagels welcome delegates

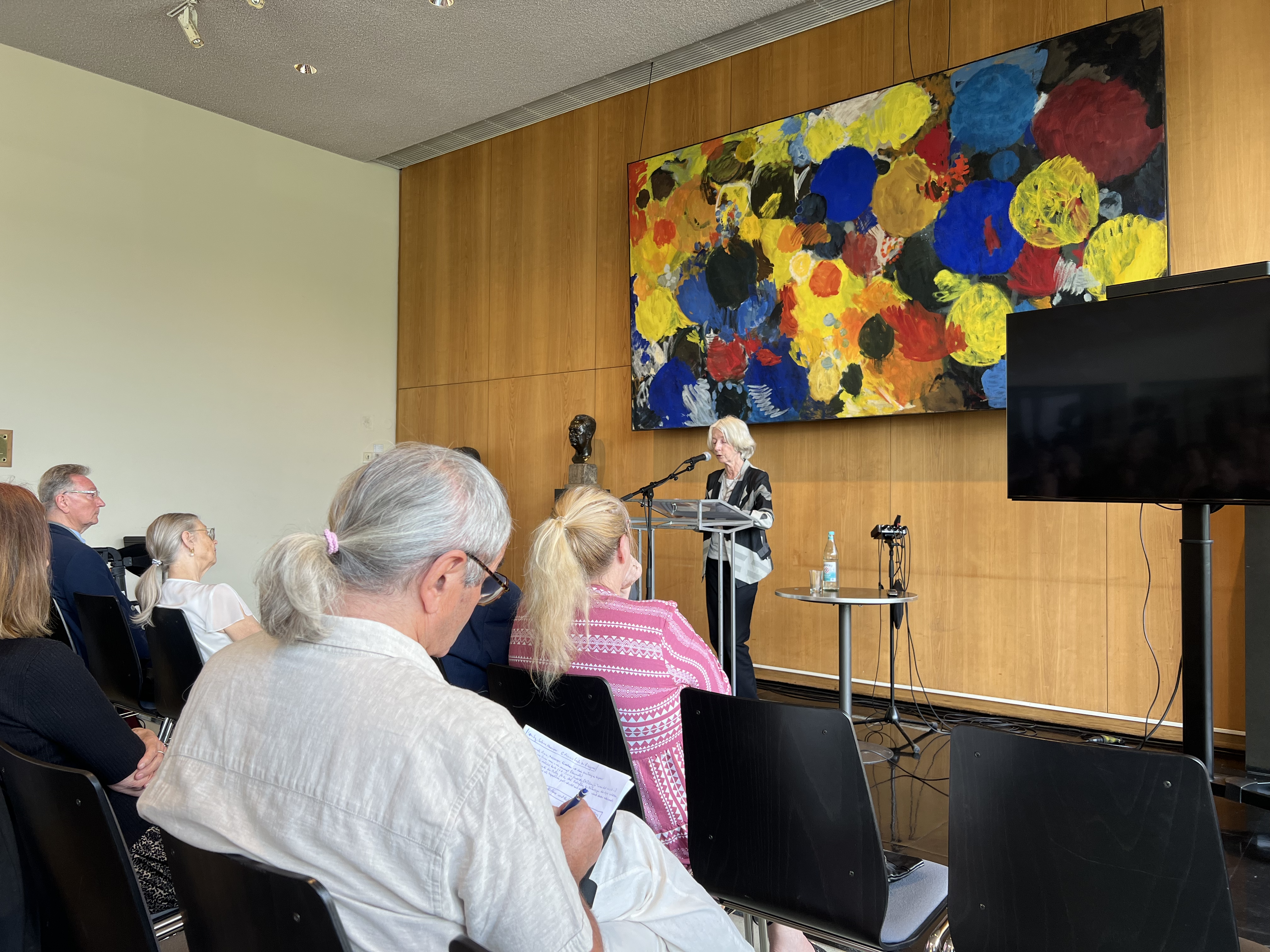
Nike Wagner address to the 2024 Symposium Deutsche Oper Berlin

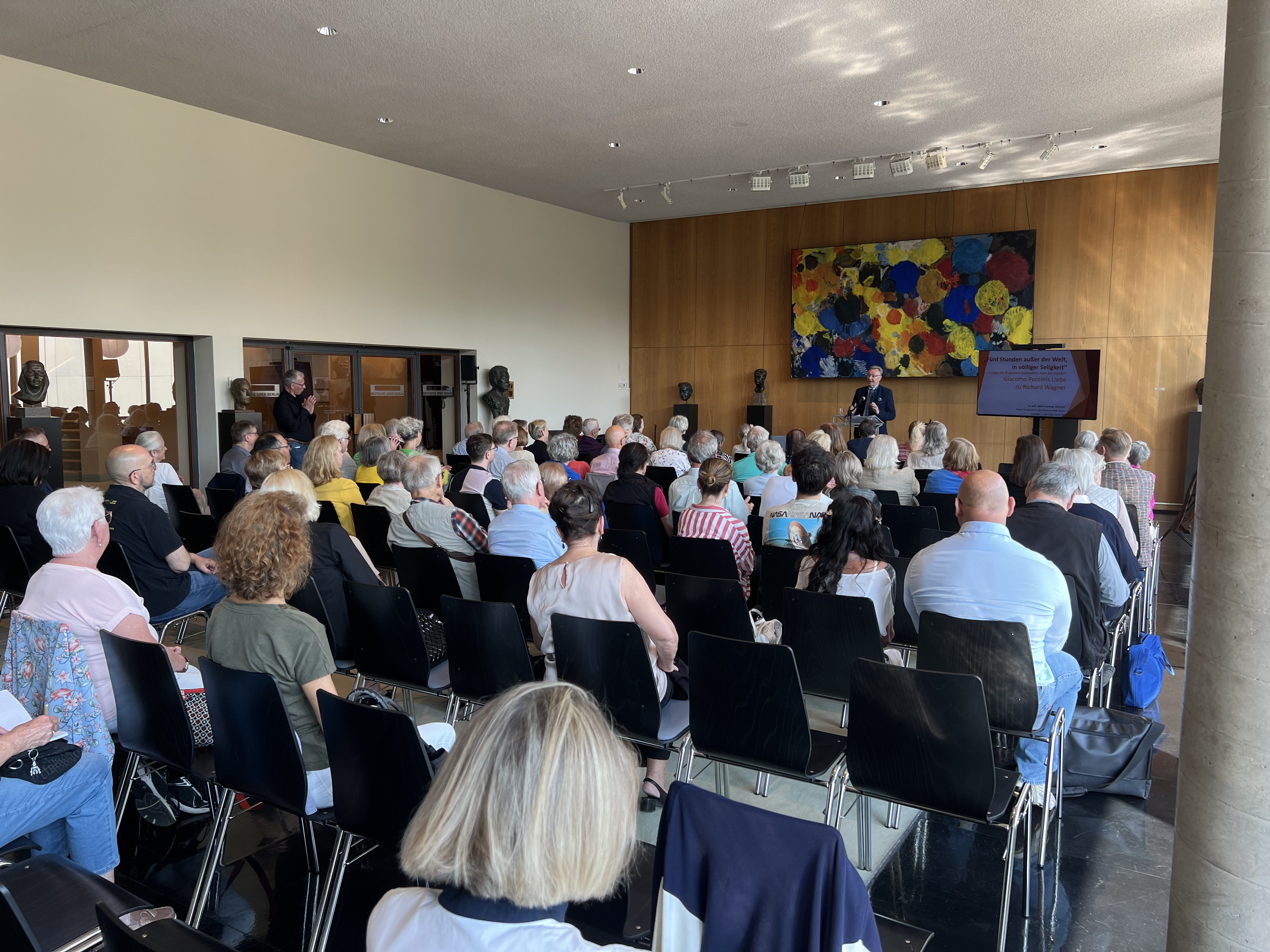
RWVI President Rainer Fineske welcomes Symposium 2024

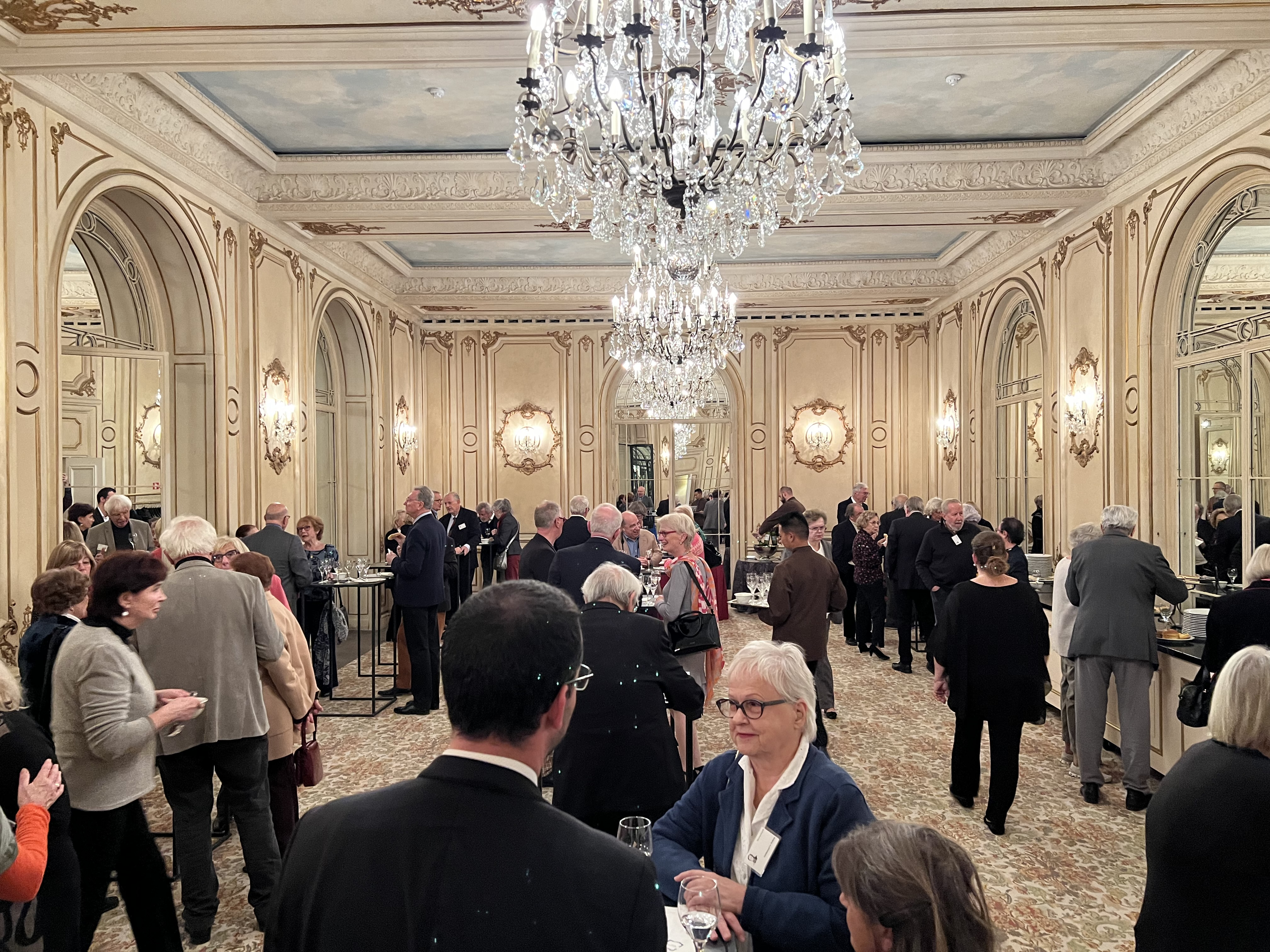
Congress 2023, Brussels, Assembly of Delegates

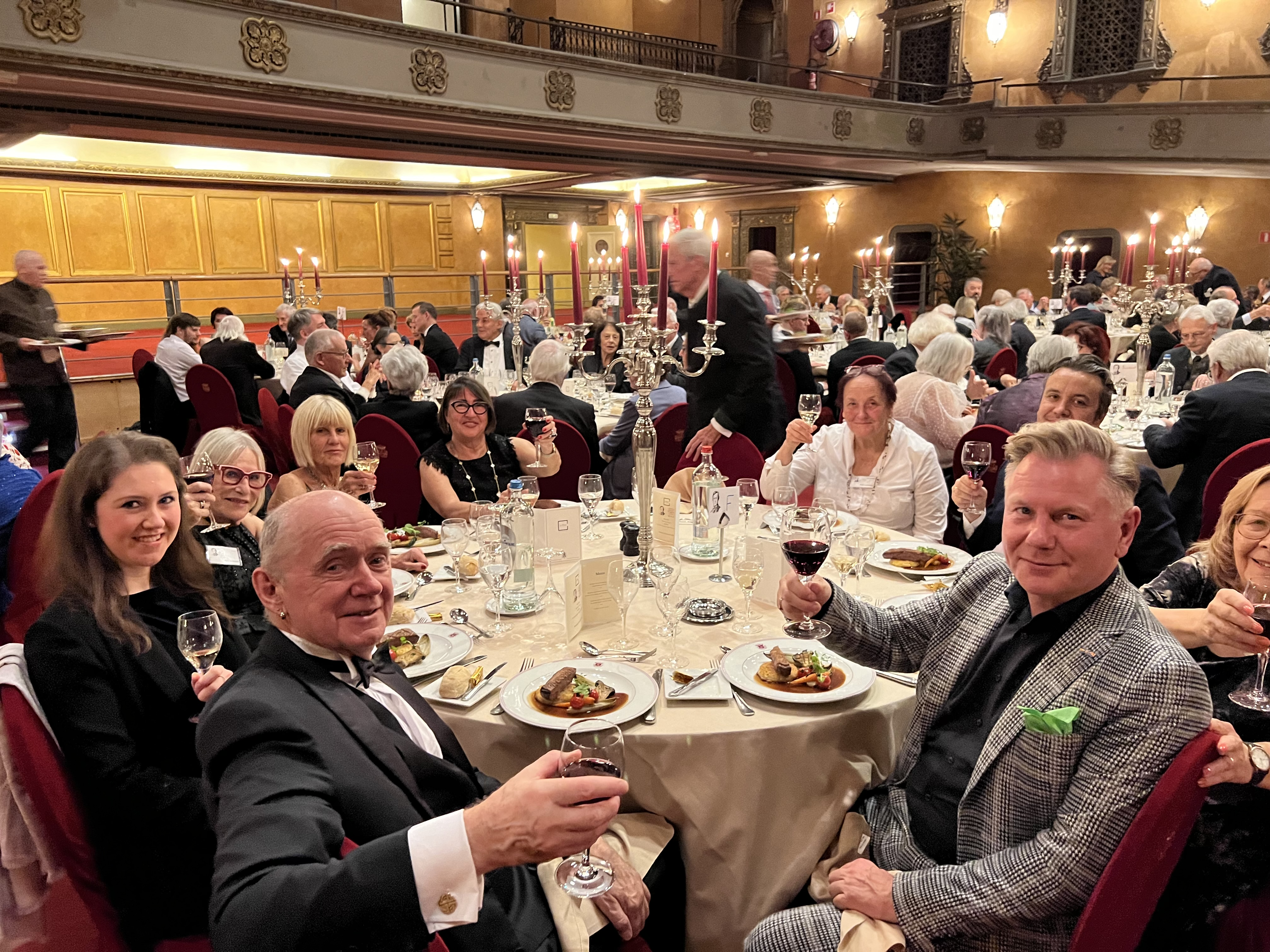
RWVI Congress 2023, Brussels, Gala Dinner

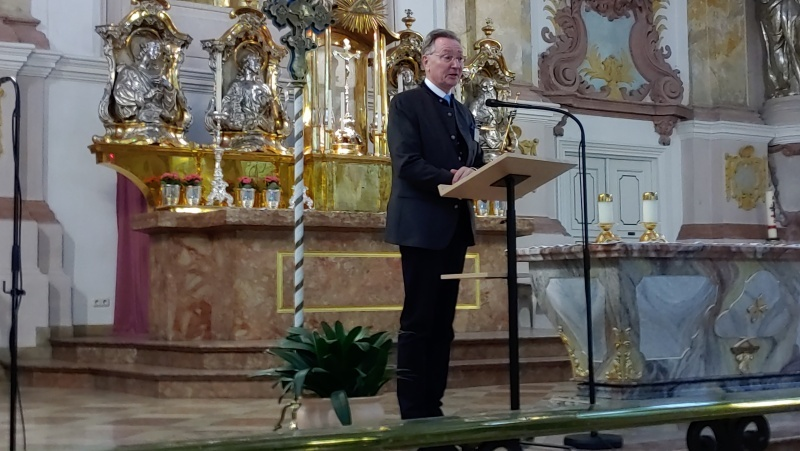
Opening RWVI Congress Munich 2021 President Rainer Fineske

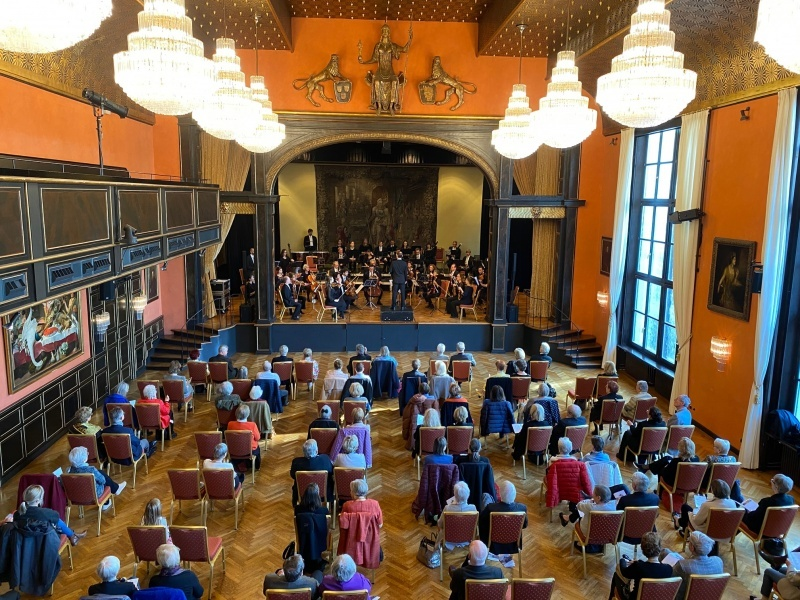
2021 Congress Lenbachplatz farewell

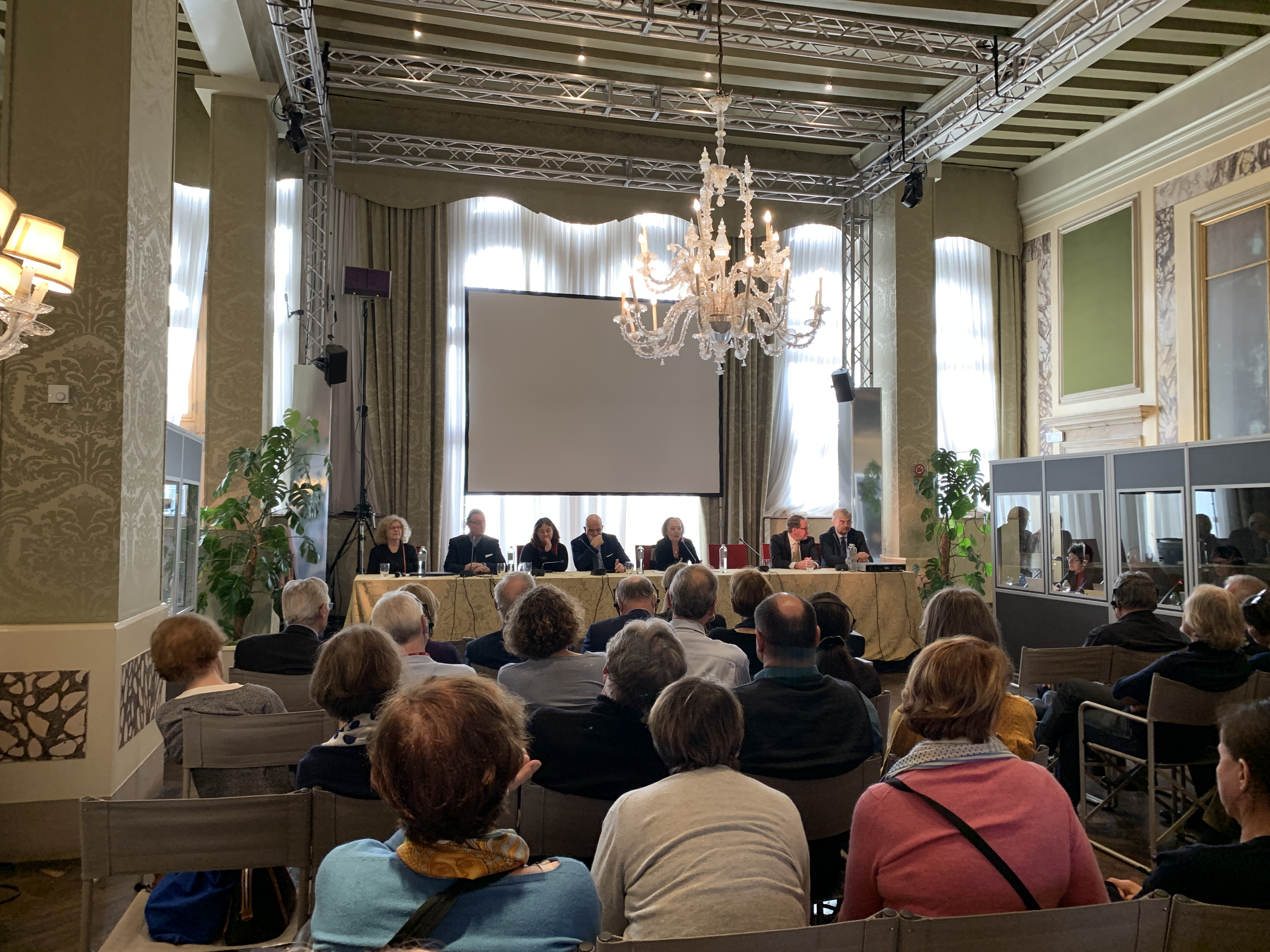
RWVI 2019 Congress Assembly of Delegates held in Venice at the Ca' Vendramin Calergi

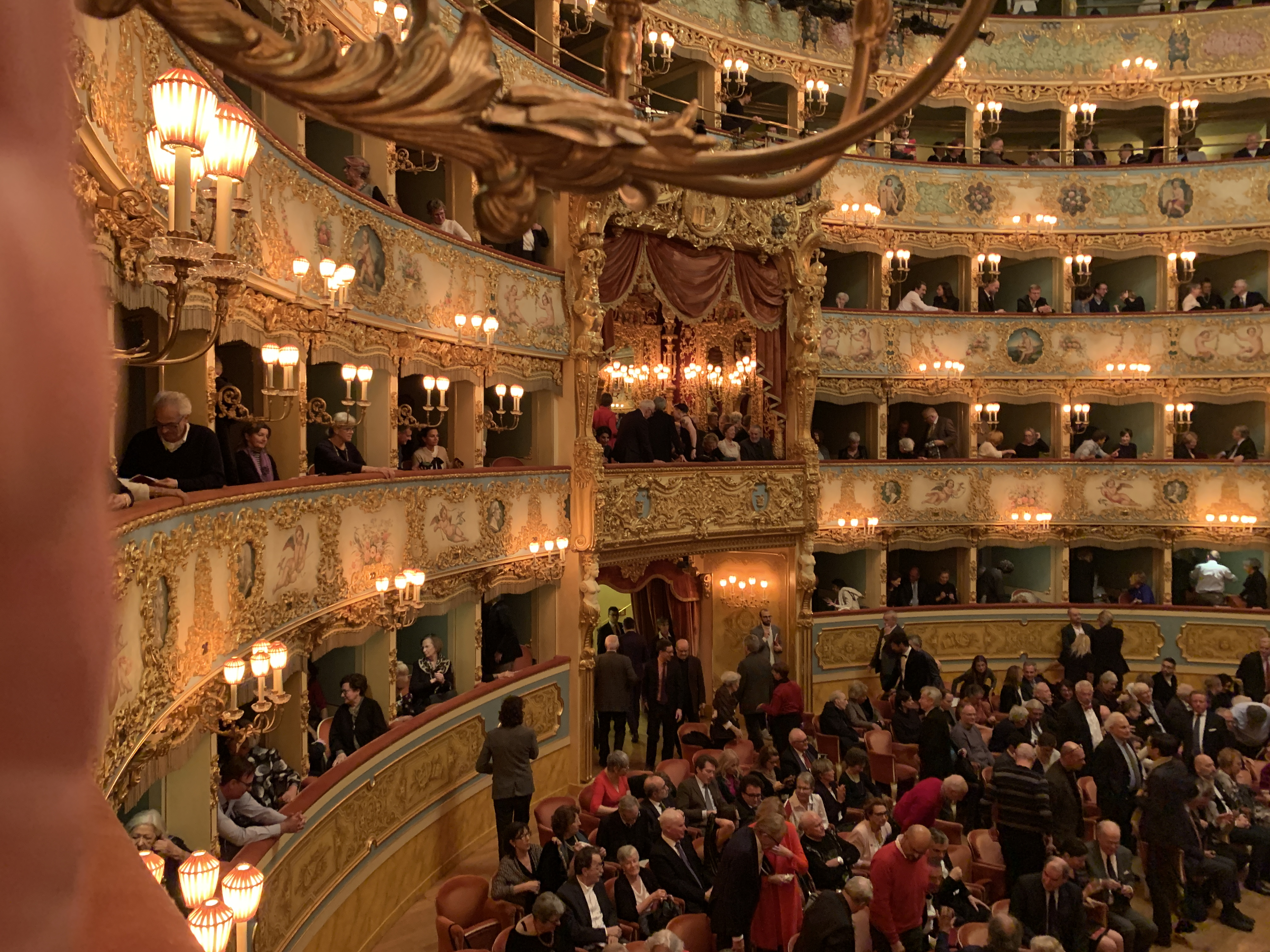
RWVI at Teatro La Fenice: Wagner Symphony No 1 & Wesendonck Lieder

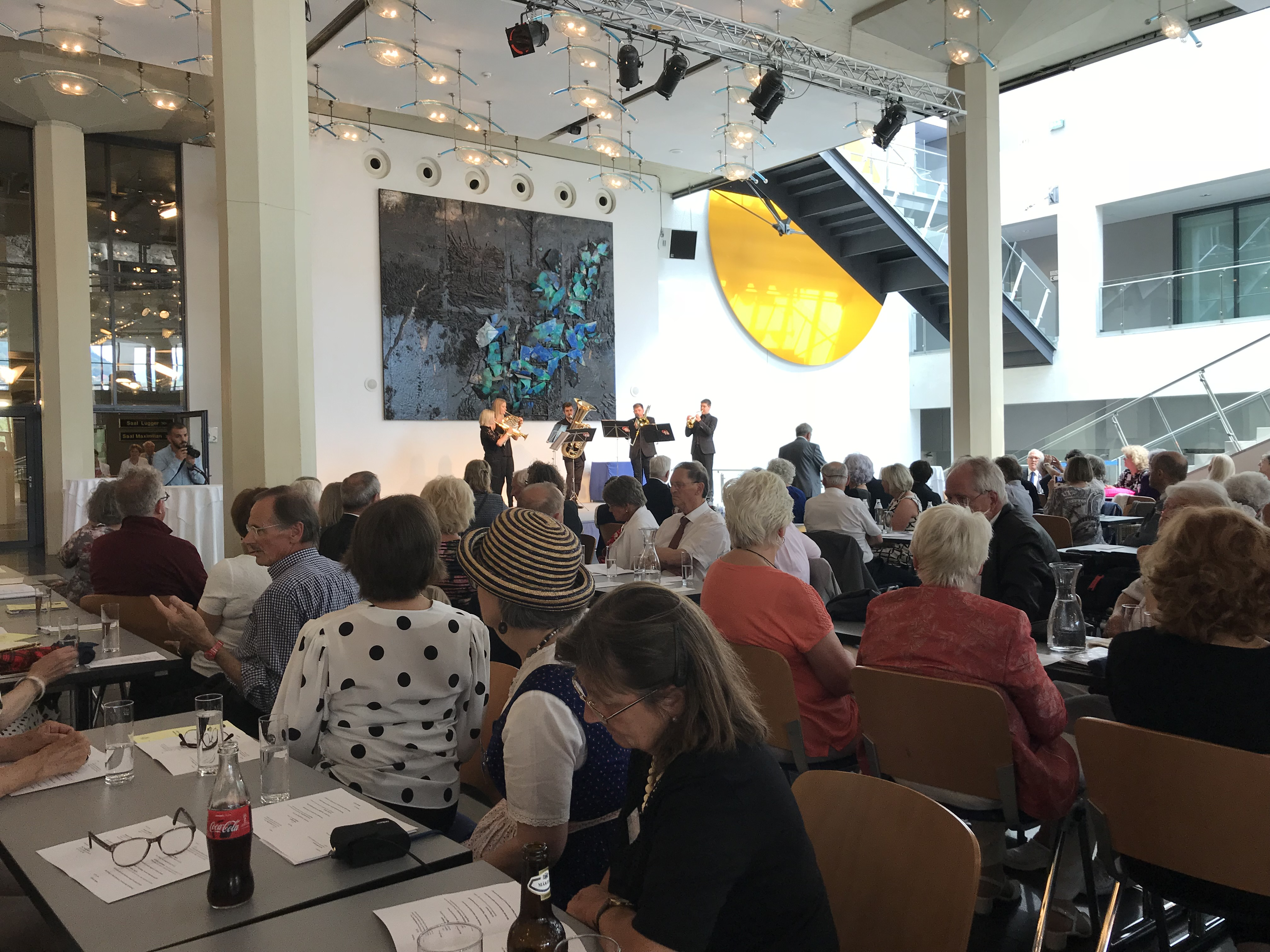
2018 Assembly of the Delegates, RWVI Congress at Innsbruck

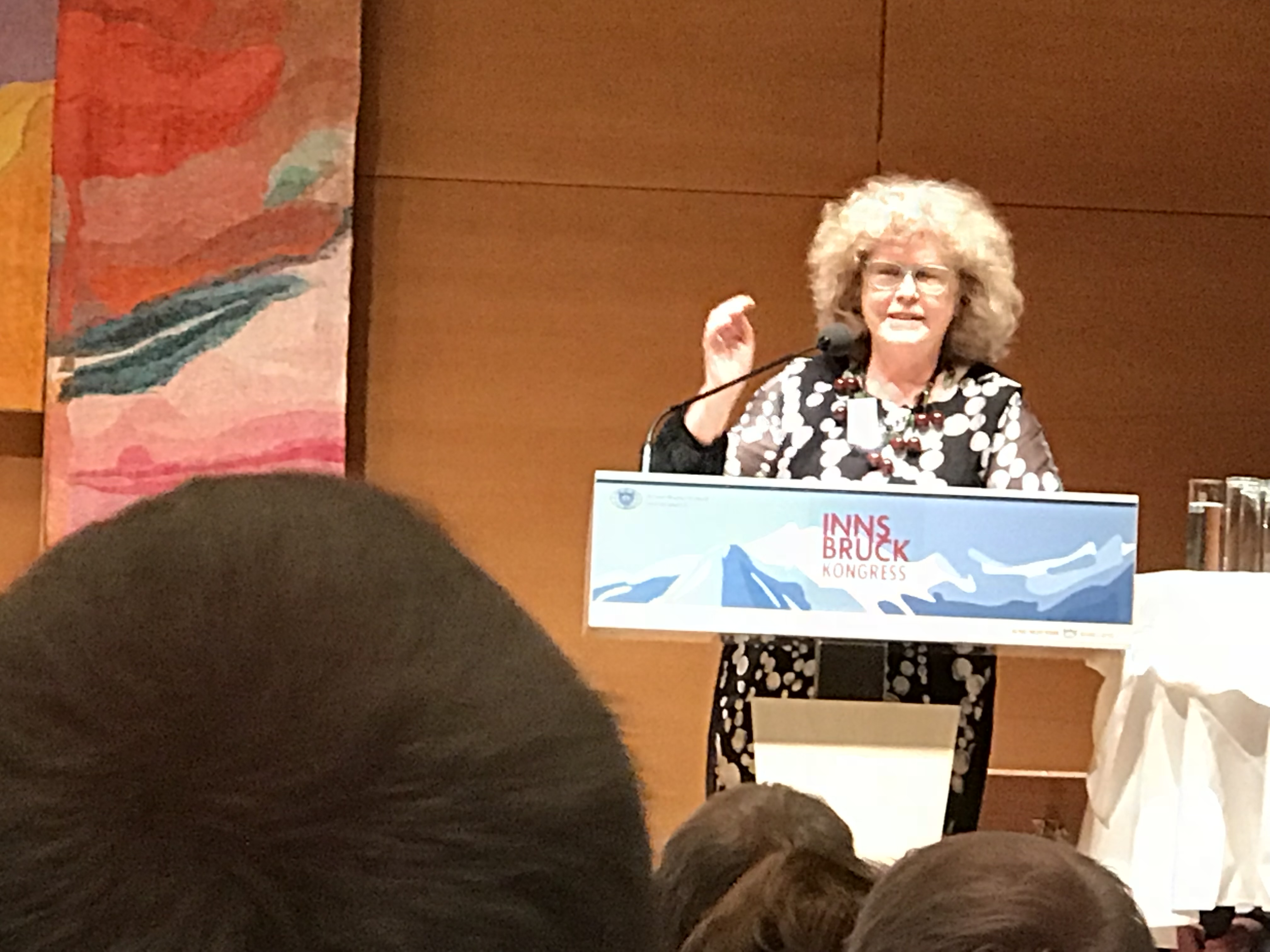
Eva Wagner-Pasquier address to the 2018 Innsbruck Congress

Every year, members of the local Wagner Societies gather for the Richard Wagner International Congress to share experiences and to plan for the future in sessions. The congress takes place in a different city each year:

- 2026: Amsterdam
- 2025: Bayreuth (Assembly of Delegates)
- 2024: Berlin
- 2023: Brussels
- 2019: Venice
- 2018: Innsbruck
- 2017: Budapest
- 2016: Strasbourg
- 2015: Dessau
- 2014: Graz
- 2013: Leipzig
- 2012: Prague
- 2011: Wrocław
- 2010: Stralsund
- 2009: Dresden
- 2008: Geneva
- 2007: Weimar
- 2006: Tallinn and Helsinki
- 2005: Leipzig
- 2004: Augsburg
- 2003: Copenhagen
- 2002: Seville
- 2001: Freiburg im Breisgau
- 2000: Berlin
- 1990: Hannover
- 1986: Vienna

Congresses have also taken place in Frankfurt am Main, Bordeaux, Trier, and Budapest. As a result of the COVID pandemic, congresses planned between 2020 and 2022 in Bonn, Berlin and Madrid had to be cancelled. Originally scheduled to take place in early May in London, the 2024 Congress was moved by the RWVI, first to Madrid, then eventually took place in late May in Berlin, following organisational difficulties.

The 2026 Annual Conress is to take place from 19 to 22 February in Amsterdam.

== See also ==
- Bayreuth Festival
- Irene Sloan, Wagner Society of Southern California founder
- Richard Wagner
- Ca' Vendramin Calergi (Venice association and Wagner Museum)
