= Mecc Alte =

Mecc Alte S.p.A.
- Company type: S.p.A.
- Industry: Electrical engineering
- Founded: 1947
- Founder: Mario Carraro
- Headquarters: Via Roma, n° 20 - 36051 Creazzo, Province of Vicenza, Italy
- Area served: France, UK, Germany, Spain, Australia, USA, China, Italy, India
- Products: Electrical generators (synchronous alternators)
- Revenue: 250 million Euros (2022)
- Number of employees: c.2500
- Divisions: Rail, Marine, 400 Hz
- Website: Mecc Alte

Mecc Alte is an Italian electrical engineering company that makes electrical generators. It is based in Vicenza, in the Veneto region of north-east Italy.

== History ==
It was founded in 1947 in Alte near Vincenza.

== Products ==
The types of synchronous alternators it makes are:

- 2 pole (1 - 208 kVA)
- 4 pole (3.5 - 3000 kVA)
- 6 pole (500 - 2100 kVA)

It also makes

- Permanent magnets
- Welding generators

== See also ==
- List of Italian companies
