= Pietro Saccardo =

Italian architect

Pietro Saccardo (September 28, 1830 in Venice – November 19, 1903 in Chirignago) was an Italian architect.

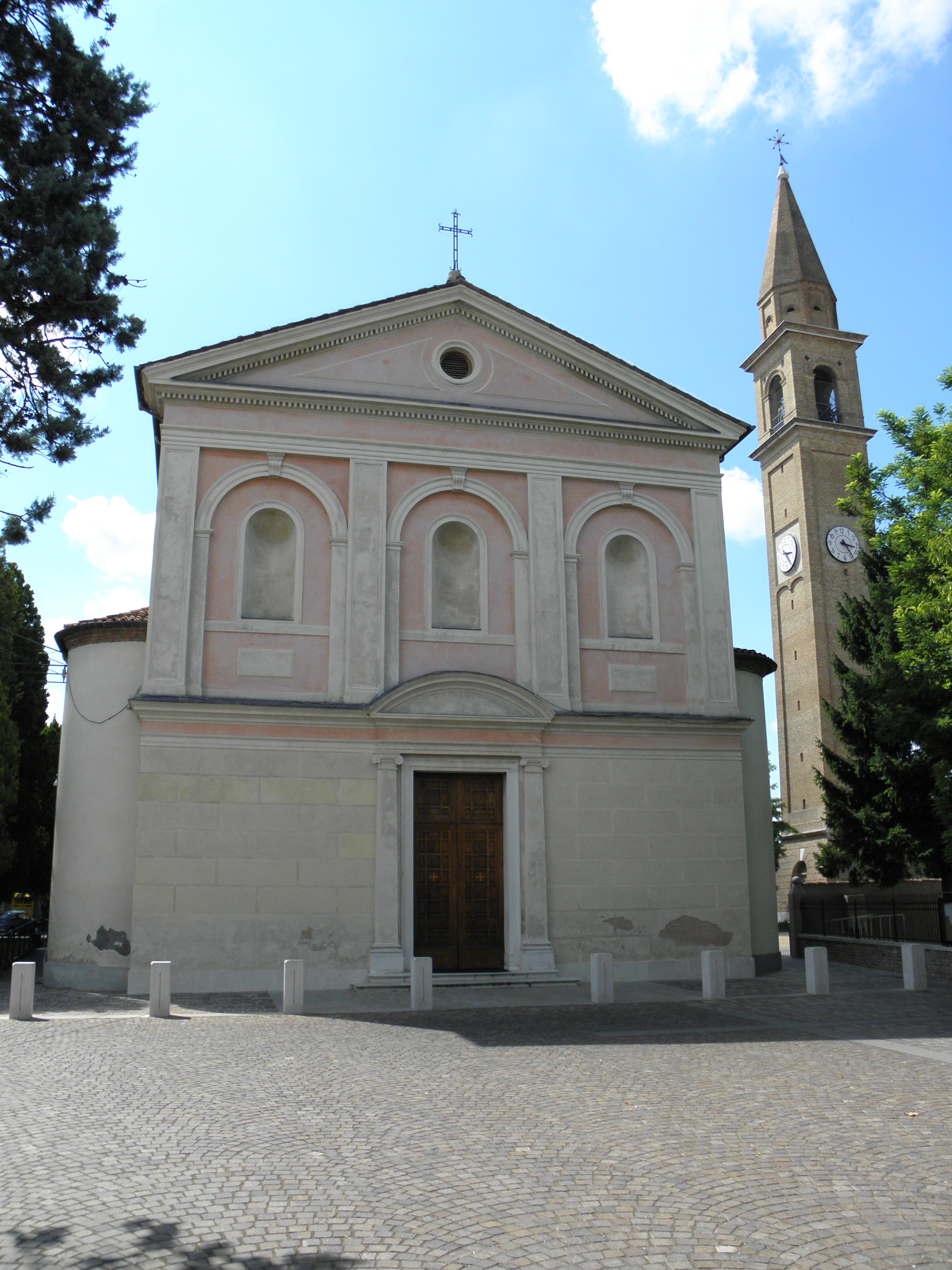
Facade of the Church of Sant'Andrea Apostolo in Favaro Veneto, designed by Saccardo.

He was born and resided in Venice.

== Architectural works ==
Among his works from 1881 are restorations of Villa Pisani in Mirano and a belltower and church of Chirignago, one of the mainland boroughs of Venice, and the Colonia Agricola Astori in Milan.

From 1887 to 1902, he was proto or architect of the Basilica of St Mark and the Scuola di San Rocco in Venice.

He restored many of the mosaics in the basilica. His assistant with wall paintings was Pietro Roi.

Saccardo was blamed for not preventing the collapse of the St Mark's Campanile in 1902.
