= Bust of Andrea Loredan =

Sculpture by Antonio Rizzo

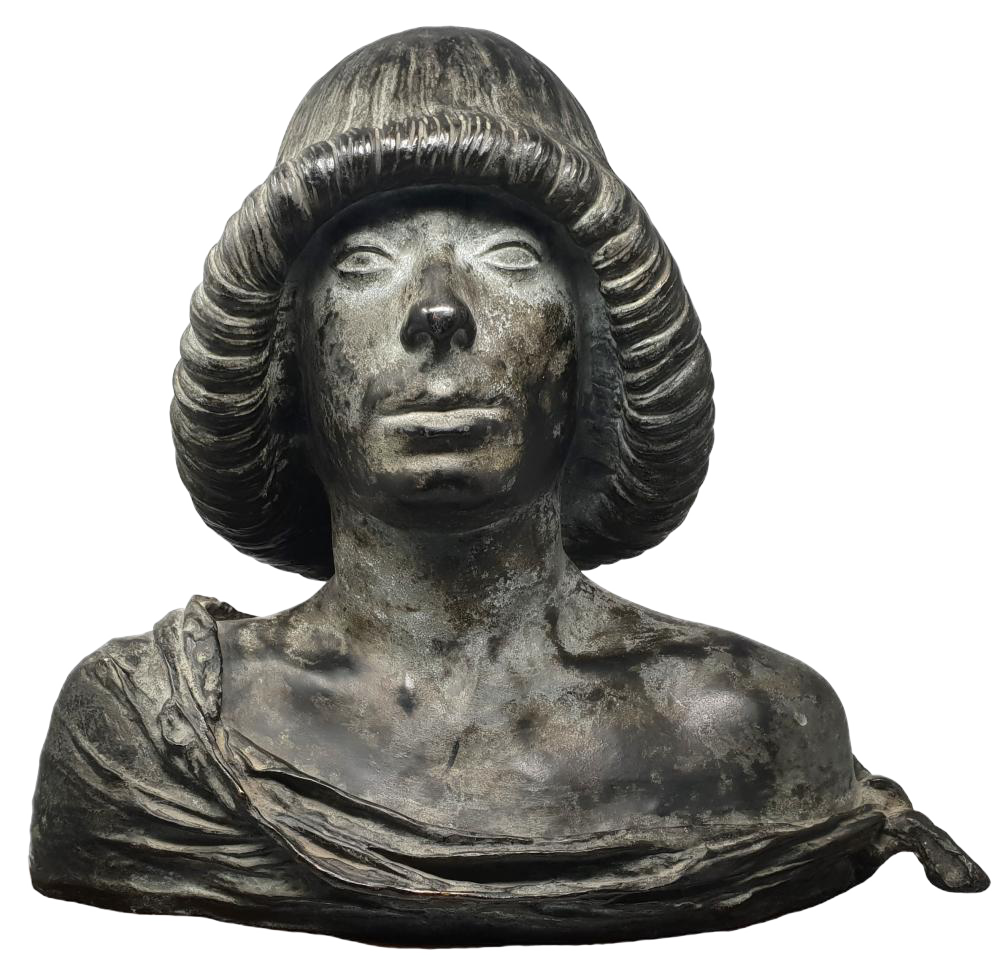
- Artist: Antonio Rizzo
- Completion date: 15th century
- Medium: Bronze
- Movement: Italian Renaissance
- Subject: Andrea Loredan
- Location: Museo Correr, Venice

The Bust of Andrea Loredan is an Italian Renaissance sculpture by the Italian architect and sculptor Antonio Rizzo, one of the greatest active in Venice in the latter half of the 15th century. It depicts Andrea Loredan, a Venetian nobleman of the Loredan family known as a collector of art. It is on display at the Museo Correr in Venice and it is also mentioned in many books. It was also depicted by Joseph Lindon Smith in a painting now kept in the Harvard Art Museums.
