= Protomaestro =

Title in the Venetian Republic

Protomaestro or Proto was a title in the Venetian Republic referring to the head of construction or senior technical specialist responsible for the maintenance of buildings and engineering systems in the cities of the Venetian Lagoon.

The title "protomaestro" was not synonymous with "architect" or "building designer"; the "proto" often combined several roles, including those of an architect, foreman, clerk, construction manager, coordinator, and financial overseer for building projects. According to Vincenzo Scamozzi, among other responsibilities, the "proto" was expected to "understand all aspects of construction, such as laying foundations, erecting walls, and building vaults, as well as being capable of erecting columns and all types of brick ornamentation, and of setting carved stones in place properly".

The position of protomaestro was prestigious and well-paid. Construction projects took many years, so the "proto" often held a stable job with good wages, sometimes including accommodation and meals. During the construction of San Zaccaria in 1458, Antonio Gambello was appointed proto with a salary of 100 ducats per year. His successor Mauro Codussi received 80 ducats, likely due to an arrangement allowing him to return to Bergamo every winter. Antonio Rizzo, as proto of the Doge's Palace in 1484, was paid 100 ducats, and by the summer of 1485, his salary was raised to 125 ducats; by October 1491, he was receiving no less than 200 ducats. Additionally, it is known that in the winter of 1544, the salary of the protomaestro of St Mark's Basilica, architect Jacopo Sansovino, was 200 ducats per year.

The protomaestro was responsible for all aspects of construction. When, under still unclear circumstances, part of the Marciana Library collapsed during construction, Sansovino was dismissed from his position, fined heavily, and imprisoned. The new library building had begun under Sansovino’s design in 1537, but on December 18, 1545, the vault made of heavy masonry collapsed. In the subsequent investigation, Sansovino claimed that the workers had prematurely removed the temporary wooden supports before the concrete had fully set and that a cannon shot, fired from a nearby galley as part of a salute, caused a fatal vibration. Nevertheless, Sansovino was sentenced to personally compensate for the damage (estimated between 800 and 1000 ducats), a debt he paid off over the next 20 years. In 1565, the procurators wrote off the remaining debt in exchange for sculptures by Sansovino. The decision of the procurators, dated March 20, 1565, is preserved in the State Archives of Venice. Additionally, Sansovino's salary as protomaestro was suspended until 1547. After the collapse, the design was modified, and a lighter wooden structure was used to support the roof.

== Notable protos ==
Famous architects such as Jacopo Sansovino, Baldassare Longhena, and Pietro Saccardo served as protos of the Basilica of St. Mark in Venice, while Alessandro Tremignon was the proto of the Venetian Arsenal. Andrea Tirali served as proto for the Magistrato alle acque, the institution responsible for the hydraulic systems of the Venetian Lagoon.

Antonio Rizzo and Pietro Lombardo were protos of the Doge's Palace.

Today, the term "protomaestro" is still used by the Patriarchate of Venice to refer to the person responsible for overseeing and maintaining St. Mark's Basilica.
