= Pietro Ròi =

Italian painter (1819–1896)

Pietro Ròi (1819 in Sandrigo – 1896 in Venice) was an Italian painter. He initially studied at the Accademia di Belle Arti of Venice, but then traveled to Rome in 1843, where he was influenced by the Neoclassic and Romantic artists Minardi and Consoni, and the Nazarene painter Overbeck. He traveled extensively through Europe, but finally settled in Venice. He painted historical paintings, portraits, and landscapes. He has a self-portrait at the Uffizi in Florence.
