= Costabissara =

- Comune
- Comune di Costabissara
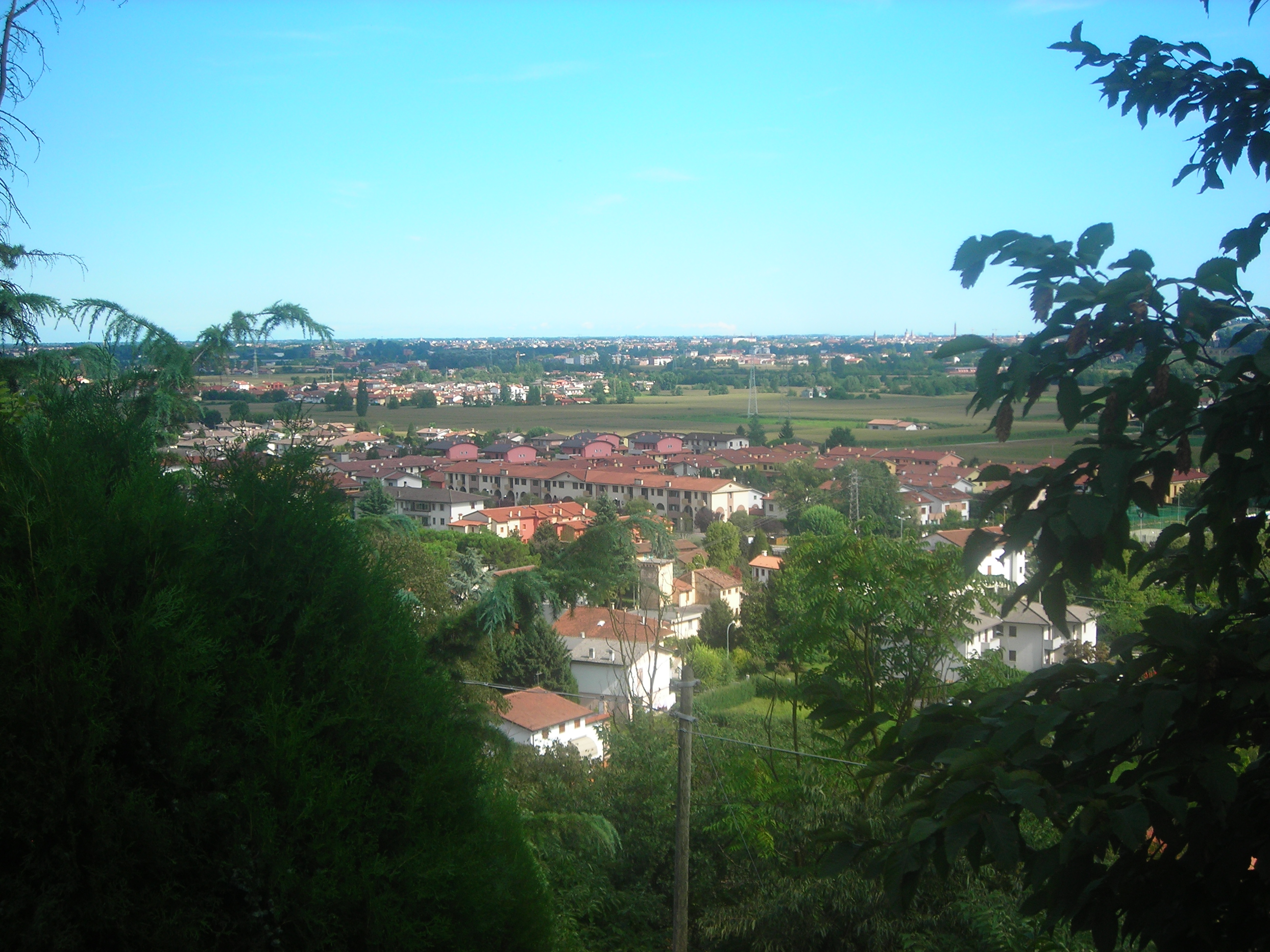
- View of Costabissara

- Coat of arms

- Location within Italy Location within Veneto
- Coordinates: 45°35′N 11°29′E
- Country: Italy
- Region: Veneto
- Province: Vicenza (VI)
- Frazioni: Motta

Government
  - Mayor: Giovanni Maria Forte

Area
  - Total: 13.21 km^{2} (5.10 sq mi)
- Elevation: 51 m (167 ft)

Population (30 June 2017)
  - Total: 7,602
  - Density: 575.5/km^{2} (1,490/sq mi)
- Demonym: Bissaresi
- Time zone: UTC+1 (CET)
  - Summer (DST): UTC+2 (CEST)
- Postal code: 36030
- Dialing code: 0444
- Website: Official website

Costabissara is a town and comune in the province of Vicenza, Veneto, northern Italy. It is west of the SP46 provincial road.
