= Creazzo =

Comune in Veneto, Italy

Creazzo Creaso (Venetian)
- Comune
- Comune di Creazzo
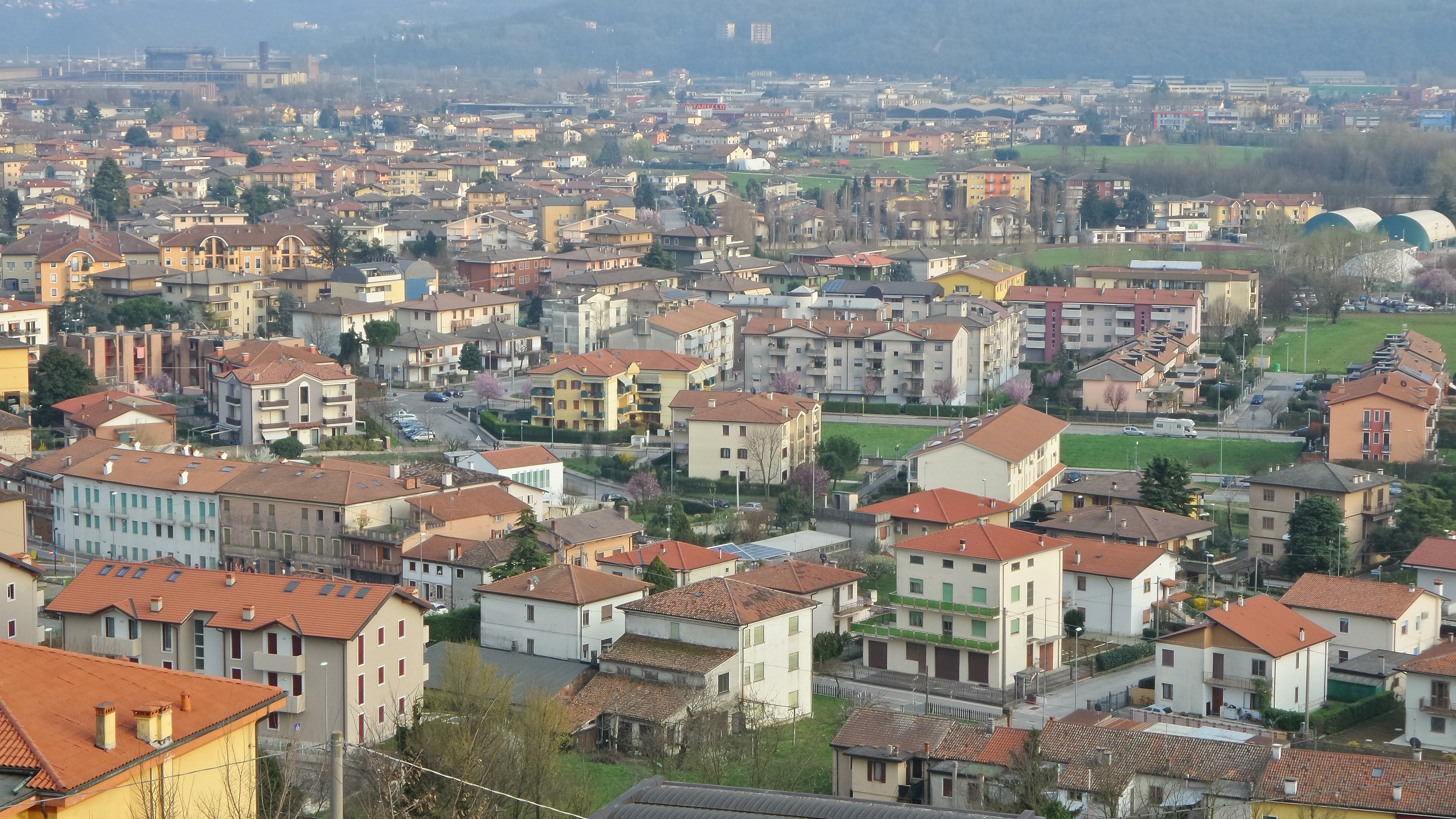
- View of Creazzo from the borough of Olmo

- Location within Italy Location within Veneto
- Coordinates: 45°32′N 11°29′E
- Country: Italy
- Region: Veneto
- Province: Vicenza (VI)
- Frazioni: Olmo

Government
  - Mayor: Carmela Maresca

Area
  - Total: 10 km^{2} (3.9 sq mi)
- Highest elevation: 200 m (660 ft)
- Lowest elevation: 33 m (108 ft)

Population (2017)
  - Total: 11,350
  - Density: 1,100/km^{2} (2,900/sq mi)
- Demonym: Creatini
- Time zone: UTC+1 (CET)
  - Summer (DST): UTC+2 (CEST)
- Postal code: 36051
- Dialing code: 0444
- Patron saint: Sts. Mark, Nicholas and Ulderic
- Website: Official website

Creazzo (Venetian: Creaço, locally Creaso) is a town and comune (municipality) in the province of Vicenza, Veneto, Italy. Creazzo is famous for its architecture, cheese, and broccolo fiolaro (a local variety of cabbage).

The Battle of Creazzo was fought here in 1513 between the Republic of Venice and the combined force of Spain and the Holy Roman Empire.

One major employer is Mecc Alte S.p.A., a manufacturer of alternators and generators.
