= Antonio Rizzo (architect) =

Italian architect

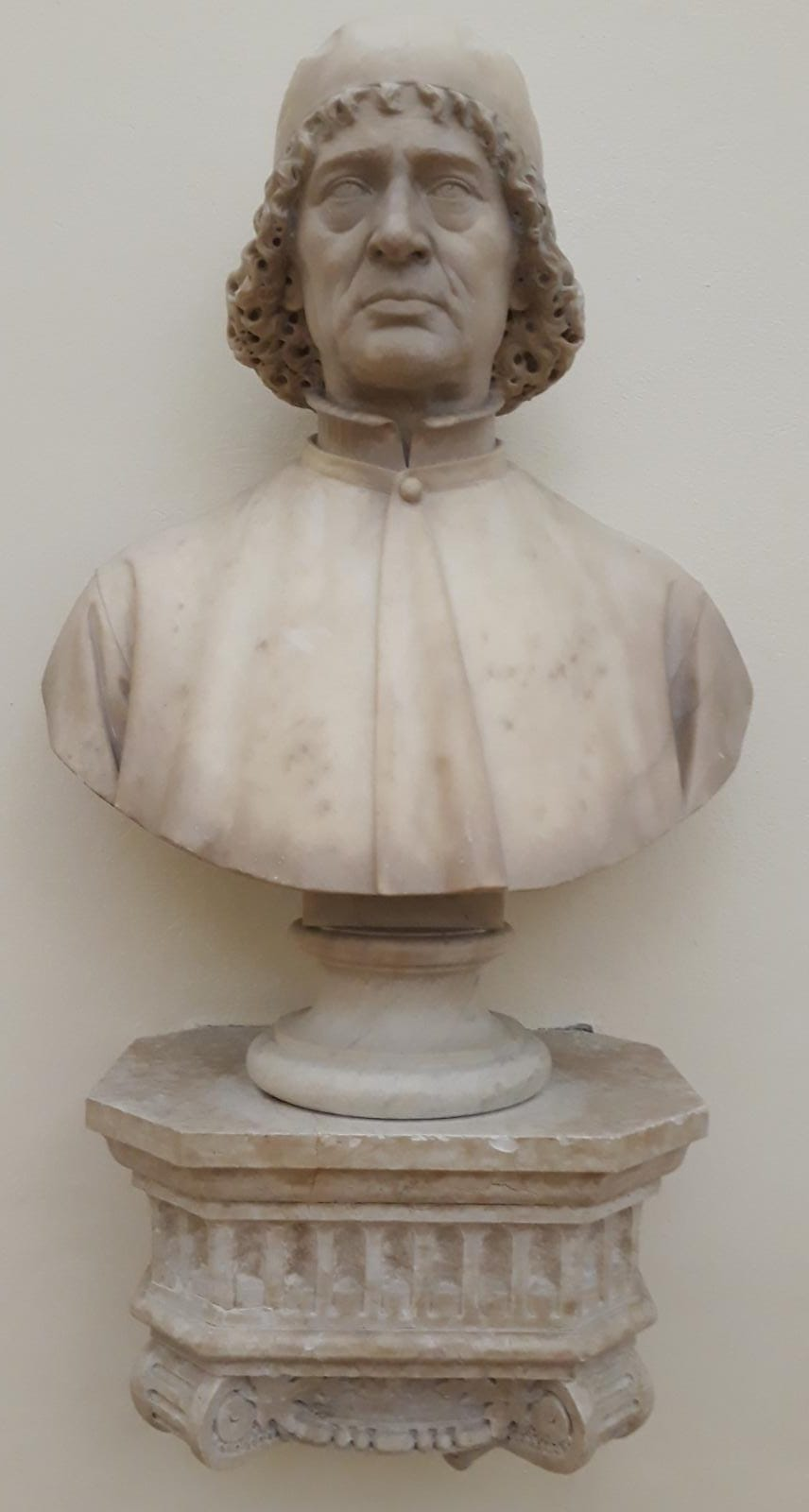
- Bust of Antonio Rizzo at the Biblioteca civica di Verona
- Born: c.1430 Osteno
- Died: c.1499 Cesena
- Known for: Sculpture, architecture
- Notable work: Scala dei Giganti (Doge's Palace, Venice)
- Movement: Renaissance

Antonio Rizzo (Osteno, c. 1430 – Cesena, c. 1499) was an Italian architect and sculptor, one of the greatest active in Venice in the latter half of the fifteenth century. Among his designs are the Scala dei Giganti (Staircase of the Giants), the stairs leading to the State Apartments of the Doge's Palace.

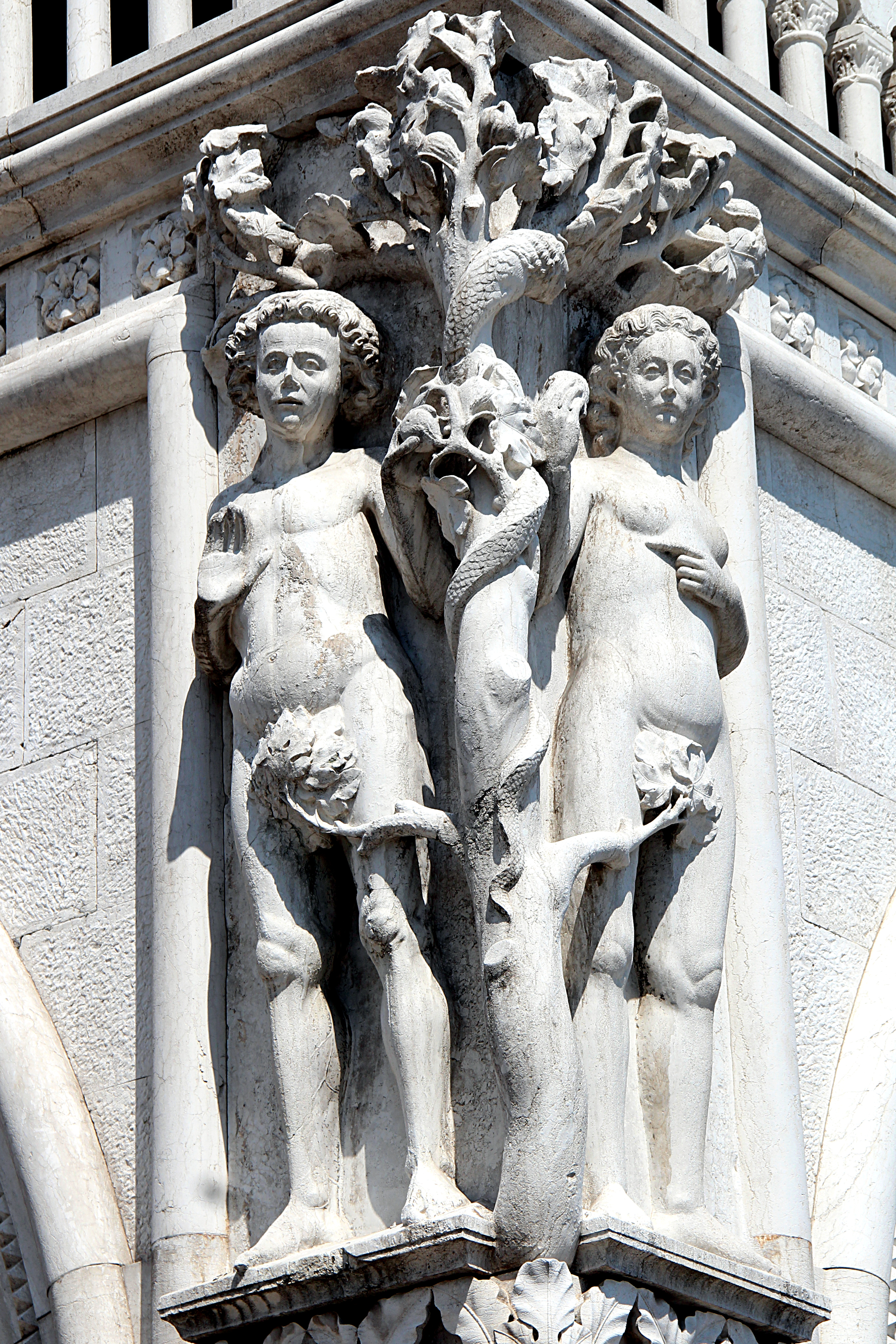
The Fall of Adam and Eve, a work produced in 1476 adorning the top of the capital of the southwest corner of the Palazzo Ducale in Venice.

== Life ==
Antonio Rizzo was the son of Rizzo di ser Giovanni of Osteno. He completed his apprenticeship on the site of the Certosa di Pavia. From 1457, he worked in Venice, in Antonio Bregno's workshop.

Around 1469, Rizzo lived in a house belonging to the Benedictine nunnery of Santa Zaccaria, after his marriage to Maria, the daughter of the administrator of the nunnery. There is also evidence of a son, Simplicio, who was likely the Venetian goldsmith documented as active in Rome in the beginning of the 16th century.

In 1474 and 1478, Rizzo was sent to Scutari as a military engineer. Both times (during the First Venetian-Ottoman war), the Ottoman Turks had besieged the town. He was to improve the fortifications there. He was lauded for continuously doing his patriotic duty, and received injuries. Although the citadel was lost, Rizzo was awarded a monthly pension of 1 ducat for twenty years for himself and his family.

In 1484, Rizzo was appointed as proto or chief architect for the restoration of the Doge's Palace. His successful career came to a sudden end in 1498 when he was found guilty of embezzlement of between 10,000 and 80,000 ducats. He sold his house and fled first to Ancona, then to Foligno, and finally to Cesena, where he is believed to have died shortly thereafter.

== Career ==
Till the 1960s, the accepted history of Rizzo's early years was that he was the supplier of columns, capitals and bases for the Certosa di Pavia's large cloister, which led to the attribution of the arcades of the cloister to him, and that in the 1460s he had been influenced by Lombard sculpture. This consensus was based on a payment document to Magistro Ricio de Verona dated 1465-1467, but was overturned in the 1970s when it was realised that the Ricio was more likely to have been Rizzo's father (though no proof of blood relationship has been found).

Rizzo's premier patron in Venice was the Doge Cristoforo Moro, who commissioned him to create altars for the basilica of San Marco, after which he became the chosen sculptor and architect of the Venetian Signoria. This suggests that Rizzo already had a considerable reputation by the time he arrived in Venice. It is likely that Gregorio Correr, a Venetian noble, who had been his patron as well as Mantegna's in Verona, had recommended Rizzo to Moro to introduce the new Renaissance style into the basilica.

Influenced by Bregno's gothic sensibility, in around 1464, Rizzo sculpted the figures of the Annunciation, the Allegories and the Virtues for the funerary monument of the Doge Francesco Foscari located in the Church of Santa Maria dei Frari.

Towards 1467, Rizzo decorated the portal of the Church of Sant'Elena with a work Vittore Cappello genuflecting before Saint Helena. While this was attributed by Francesco Sansovino to a Antonio Dentone, there is an acceptance that Dentone is none other than Rizzo. This work is characterized by a vibrant realism, with Cappello's face a depiction of tense pleading, and his neck distorted and strained. However, Saint Helena's figure, noticeably in different material and style, is attributed to a coworker of Rizzo's rather than to the sculptor.

A budding Renaissance style becomes evident in his statues (such as Mars) for the crown of the Arco Foscari at the Doge's Palace, which he worked on between the early to mid 1460s.

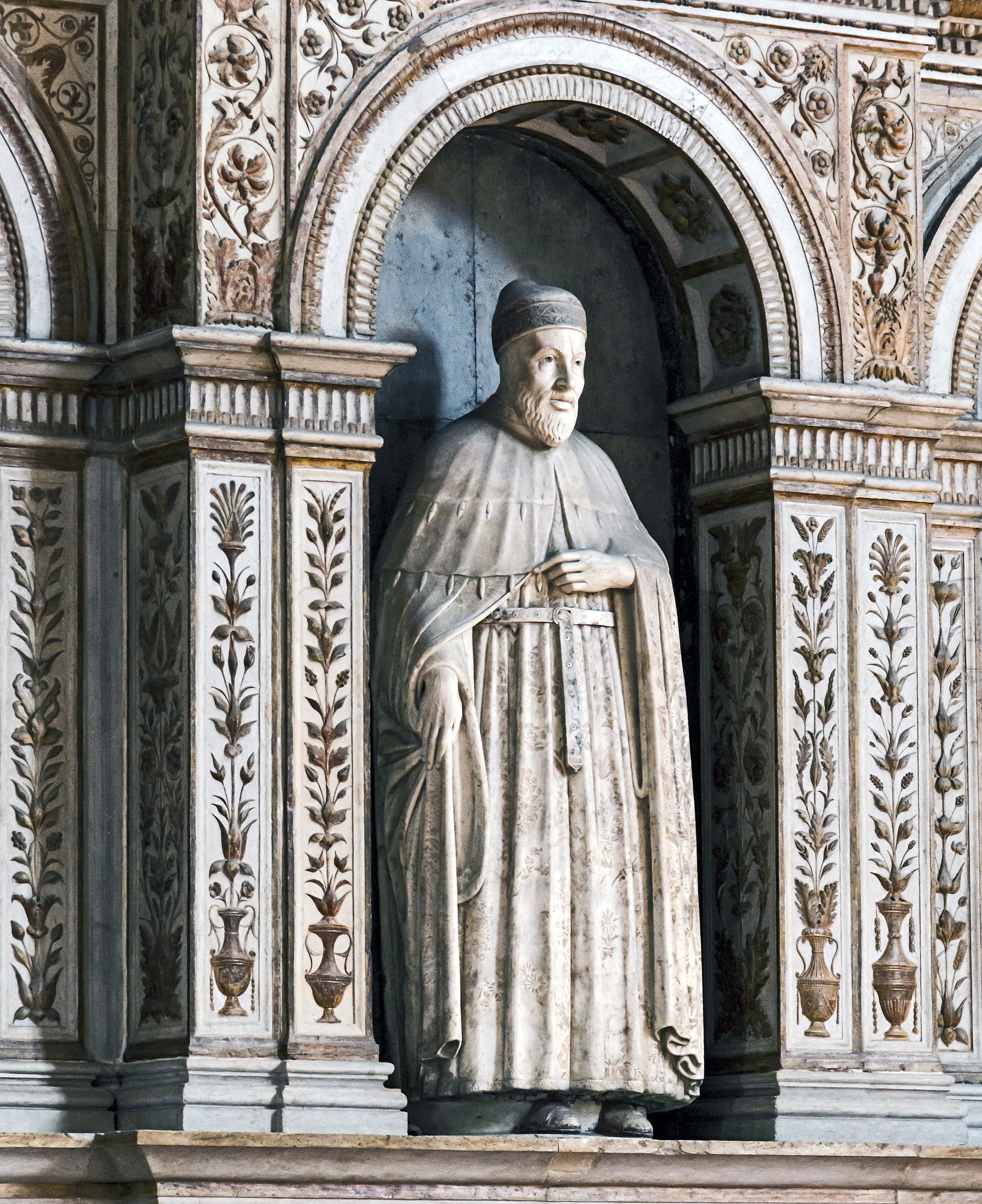
Rizzo's Statue of Doge Tron

Rizzo executed a spiral staircase with pulpit decorated with figurative reliefs at the Scuola Grande di San Marco in 1476. Its design was by Gentile Bellini. A fire in 1485 destroyed these works.

Influenced by Antonello da Messina, Rizzo's style evolved to a geometrization of forms and clearer volumes. The statues of Adam and Eve in the Arco Foscari, and the Monument to the Doge Tron are outstanding. Rizzo based his statues on nude models, working in a naturalistic fashion, with neither the muscle-bound Adam nor the broad-hipped Eve subscribing to classical conceptions of human proportions. Rizzo's Adam and Eve may have influenced Albrecht Dürer, who was present in Venice between 1490-1495. For instance, Dürer's niche motif of Fortuna was inspired by the narrow niches of Venetian funereal monuments, though this derivation has been questioned.

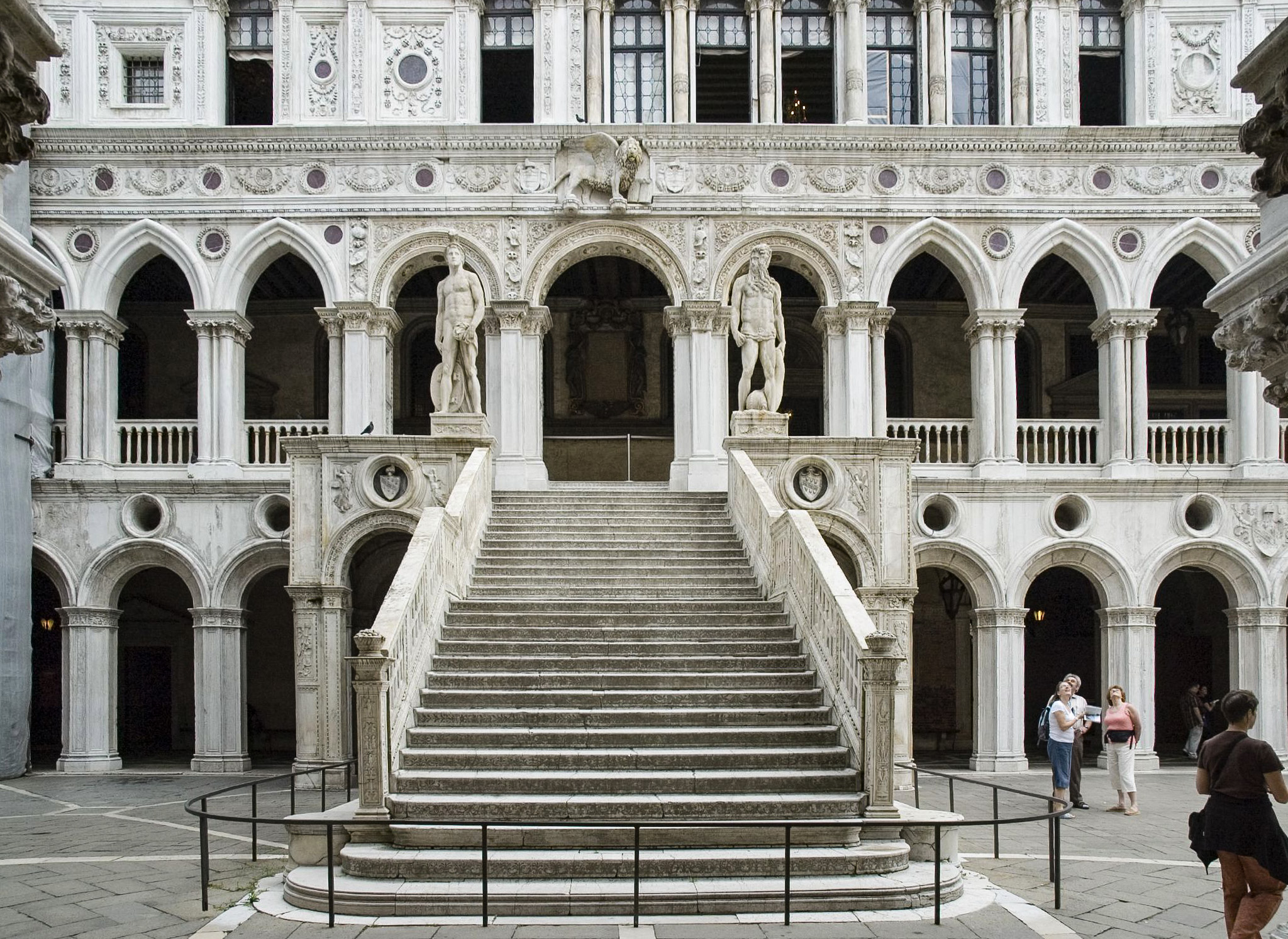
Rizzo's Scala dei Giganti, Doge's Palace, Venice

Rizzo's final style is represented by the sculptures in the internal facade of the Doge's Palace. After its damage by fire on 14 September 1483, he redesigned a new east wing on the courtyard, planned a new apartment for the Doge, and executed the Scala dei Giganti. These stemmed from his appointment as proto or chief architect of the Doge's Palace, a full-time job but grossly underpaid, about which he complained bitterly, as he was unable to take on any other commission. These works occupied him between 1484 and 1498.

The Venetian Senate ordered the reconstruction of the Doge's apartment and made the appointment of Rizzo as architect. There is no evidence of any prior architectural work by Rizzo at this point, although his sculptural works were well-known, so it not immediately clear why he was chosen for the prestigious role of proto, except possibly because of his distinguished exploits at Scutari.

Rizzo's east wing was the first complete element in the Renaissance style at the Doge's Palace. His visually striking Scala dei Giganti lead up to a platform, beneath which appear reliefs of Victories. These have been called the supreme achievements of his latter career, and are remarkable for their mimicry of sfumato, a painterly technique, as well as the effects of reflected light off the broken surfaces.

It has also been argued that the bronze statues of the Moors of St Mark's Clocktower in the Piazza San Marco, cast in 1497, can be assigned to Rizzo.

== Bibliography ==
- Ceriana, Matteo (2016). "Rizzo, Antonio". Dizionario Biografico degli Italiani. Vol. 87.
- Begemann, Egbert Haverkamp (1999). Fifteenth- to Eighteenth-century European Drawings: Central Europe, the Netherlands, France, England. Metropolitan Museum of Art. ISBN 978-0-87099-918-5.
- Huse, Norbert; Wolters, Wolfgang (1993). The Art of Renaissance Venice: Architecture, Sculpture, and Painting, 1460-1590. University of Chicago. ISBN 978-0-226-36109-3.
- Giobbi, Alessandro (1971). Testimonianze di storia e cronaca del Comune di Claino con Osteno: Provincia di Como, Diocesi di Milano. Osteno.
- Goy, Richard John (2006). Building Renaissance Venice: Patrons, Architects and Builders, C. 1430-1500. Yale University. ISBN 0-300-11292-0.
- Muraro, Michelangelo (1984). "The Moors of the Clock Tower of Venice and Their Sculptor". The Art Bulletin. 66 (4): 603–609. doi:10.1080/00043079.1984.10788212.
- Munman, Robert (1971). "The Monument to Vittore Cappello of Antonio Rizzo". The Burlington Magazine. 113 (816): 138–145. JSTOR 876580.
- Ruggeri, Ugo (1979). Dürer. Barron's. ISBN 9780812021608.
- Sheard, Wendy Stedman (1987). "ANNE-MARKHAM SCHULZ, Antonio Rizzo Sculptor and Architect, Princeton, Princeton University Press, 1983. Pp. xix + 238; 240 black-and-white ills". The Art Bulletin. 69 (3). JSTOR 3051072.
