= 1503 in Italy =

List of years in Italy
- … 1493; 1494; 1495; 1496; 1497; 1498; 1499; 1500; 1501; 1502; 1503; 1504; 1505; 1506; 1507; 1508; 1509; 1510; 1511; 1512; 1513 …
- Art; Archaeology; Architecture; Literature; Music; Philosophy; Science; +...

An incomplete list of events which happened in Italy in 1503:

- Battle of Ruvo

The Battle of Ruvo was fought on 23 February 1503 between a Spanish army under Gonzalo Fernández de Córdoba and Diego de Mendoza and a French army commanded by Jacques de la Palice. The battle was part of the Second Italian War and was fought at the town of Ruvo in the Province of Bari, modern-day Italy. The result was a Spanish victory.

- Battle of Cerignola
- Battle of Garigliano (1503)
- Challenge of Barletta

The Challenge of Barletta (Italian: Disfida di Barletta) was a battle fought near Barletta, southern Italy, on February 13, 1503, on the plains between Corato and Andria.

== Births ==
- Michele Tosini

== Deaths ==
- Iovianus Pontanus
- Antonio Bonfini
- Lorenzo Cybo de Mari
- Alexander VI
