= 1503 =

1503 in various calendars
- Gregorian calendar: 1503; MDIII
- Ab urbe condita: 2256
- Armenian calendar: 952; ԹՎ ՋԾԲ
- Assyrian calendar: 6253
- Balinese saka calendar: 1424–1425
- Bengali calendar: 909–910
- Berber calendar: 2453
- English Regnal year: 18 Hen. 7 – 19 Hen. 7
- Buddhist calendar: 2047
- Burmese calendar: 865
- Byzantine calendar: 7011–7012
- Chinese calendar: 壬戌年 (Water Dog); 4200 or 3993 — to — 癸亥年 (Water Pig); 4201 or 3994
- Coptic calendar: 1219–1220
- Discordian calendar: 2669
- Ethiopian calendar: 1495–1496
- Hebrew calendar: 5263–5264
- Hindu calendars
- Vikram Samvat: 1559–1560
- Shaka Samvat: 1424–1425
- Kali Yuga: 4603–4604
- Holocene calendar: 11503
- Igbo calendar: 503–504
- Iranian calendar: 881–882
- Islamic calendar: 908–909
- Japanese calendar: Bunki 3 (文亀３年)
- Javanese calendar: 1420–1421
- Julian calendar: 1503; MDIII
- Korean calendar: 3836
- Minguo calendar: 409 before ROC 民前409年
- Nanakshahi calendar: 35
- Thai solar calendar: 2045–2046
- Tibetan calendar: ཆུ་ཕོ་ཁྱི་ལོ་ (male Water-Dog); 1629 or 1248 or 476 — to — ཆུ་མོ་ཕག་ལོ་ (female Water-Boar); 1630 or 1249 or 477

Year 1503 (MDIII) was a common year starting on Sunday of the Julian calendar.

== Events ==
=== January–March ===
- January 20 – Seville in Castile is awarded exclusive rights to trade with the New World.
- January 24 – Construction of the Henry VII Chapel at Westminster Abbey begins in the perpendicular Gothic style, the final stage of English Gothic art.
- February 13 – Challenge of Barletta: Thirteen Italian knights defeat thirteen French knights, near Barletta.
- February 23 – Third Italian War: Battle of Ruvo – The Spanish defeat the French in Italy.
- March 15 – Portuguese explorer Vasco da Gama and sailors of his Portuguese India Armada become the first Europeans to sight the Seychelles islands as Thomé Lopes notes the discovery of what will later be called Silhouette Island.

=== April–June ===
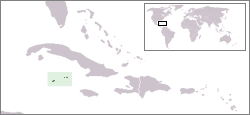
May 10: Columbus at Cayman Islands

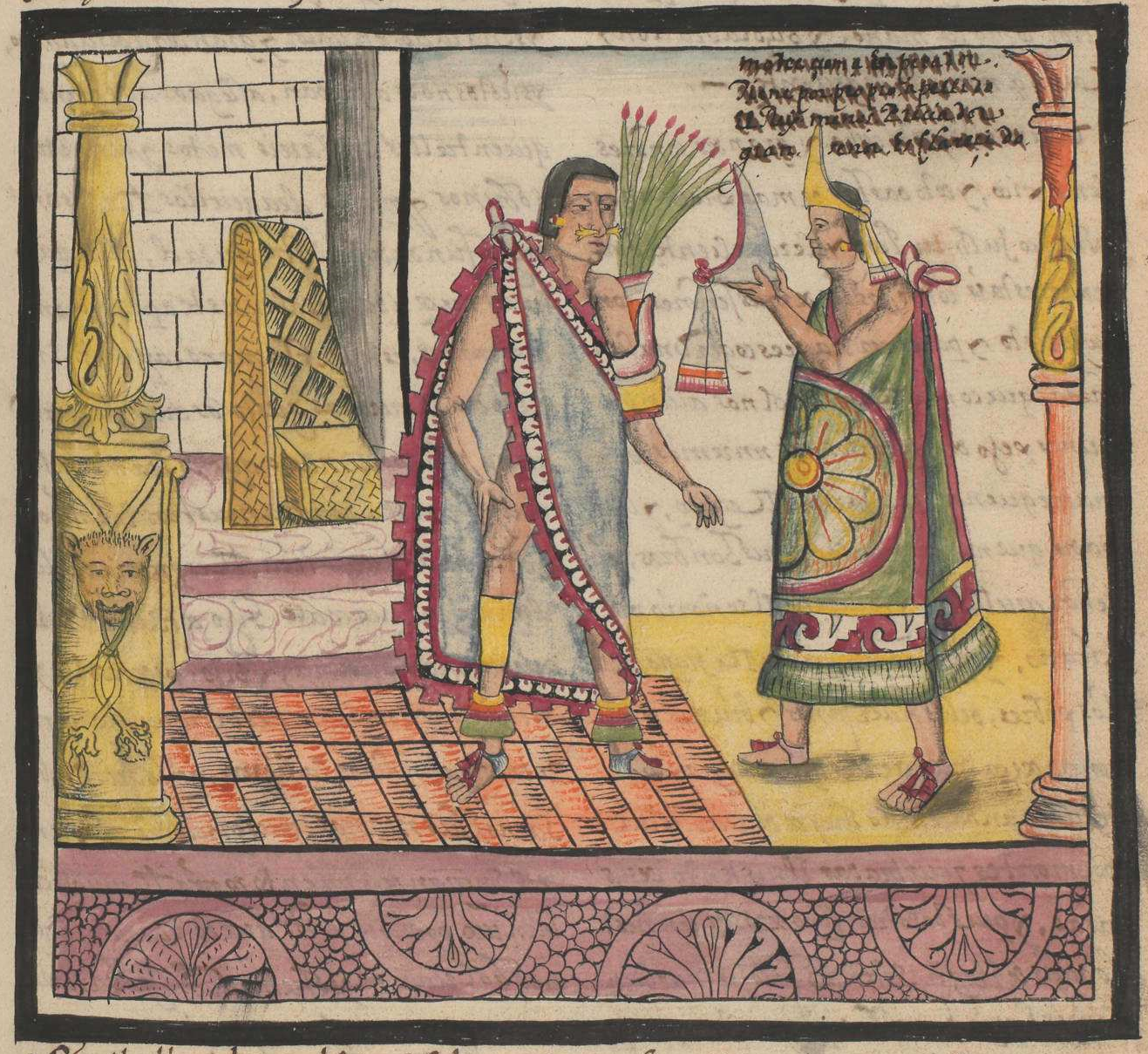
May 24: Coronation of Moctezuma II as Aztec Emperor takes place in Tenochtitlan

- April 2 – The Kingdom of Cochin (ruled by a Portuguese-installed raja, Unni Ramman Koyil II in modern-day India's Kerala state) is invaded by 50,000 Nair troops of the Zamorin of Calicut.
- April 21 – Third Italian War: Battle of Seminara – Spanish forces under Fernando de Andrade de las Mariñas defeat the French under Bernard Stewart, 4th Lord of Aubigny, who is captured, in Calabria.
- April 28 – Third Italian War: Battle of Cerignola – Spanish forces under Gonzalo Fernández de Córdoba defeat the French under Louis d'Armagnac, Duke of Nemours, who is killed, in Apulia. This is considered to be the first battle in history won by gunpowder small arms.
- May 10 – Christopher Columbus discovers the Cayman Islands, which he names Las Tortugas, after the numerous sea turtles there.
- May 13 – Naples is captured by the Spanish.
- May 20 (Feast of the Ascension) – Ascension Island is first definitively sighted, by Portuguese admiral Afonso de Albuquerque.
- May 24 – The coronation of Moctezuma II as ruler of the Aztec Empire takes place at the Aztec capital of Tenochtitlan, part of modern-day Mexico City.
- May 28 – James IV of Scotland and Margaret Tudor of England are married as per the Treaty of Perpetual Peace by Pope Alexander VI, according to Papal bull.
- June 21 – Murad, the last Sultan of Aq Qoyunlu in modern-day eastern Turkey fights the Safavid King of Persia, Ismail I in a battle near the city of Hamadan, and suffers 10,000 casualties, including his commander Güzel Ahmad.
- June 23 – Representatives of King Henry VII of England and Queen Isabella of Spain sign a treaty for 12-year-old Henry, Prince of Wales to be married to Catherine of Aragon, widow of King Henry's son Arthur.
- June 25 – After his ships are damaged in a storm, Christopher Columbus and his 230 men are forced to beach at the island of Jamaica (at modern-day Saint Ann Parish) and remain stranded there for the next six months.
- June 27 – The book The Imitation of Christ by Thomas à Kempis is re-published in an English translation.

=== July–September ===
- July 23 – Orbital calculations suggest that on this day Pluto moves outside Neptune's orbit, remaining there for 233 years.
- July 30 – Saint Helena is first definitively sighted, by ships of Portuguese navigator Estêvão da Gama returning from the East.
- August 8 – King James IV of Scotland marries Margaret Tudor, daughter of King Henry VII of England, at Holyrood Abbey, Edinburgh, Scotland.
- August 18 – Pope Alexander VI dies after a reign of 11 years, and the largest gathering of cardinals up to that time— 21 from Italy, 11 from Spain and 7 from France— is called to Rome for a papal conclave, to start in September.
- August 20 – A previous treaty between Vladislaus II of Hungary and Bayezid II, which was finalized on June 11, goes into effect. The treaty suppresses warfare along the Hungarian-Ottoman border. Stephen III of Moldavia is also included in this treaty, but it preserves his nation's independence on the condition Moldavia pays an annual tribute to the Ottoman Empire.
- September 22 – Francesco Todeschini Piccolomini, Archbishop of Siena, is elected as the new Pope after the voting cardinals cannot decide between Georges d'Amboise of France or Giuliano della Rovere of Italy. Piccolomini takes the name of Pope Pius III but will reign for only 26 days.

=== October–December ===
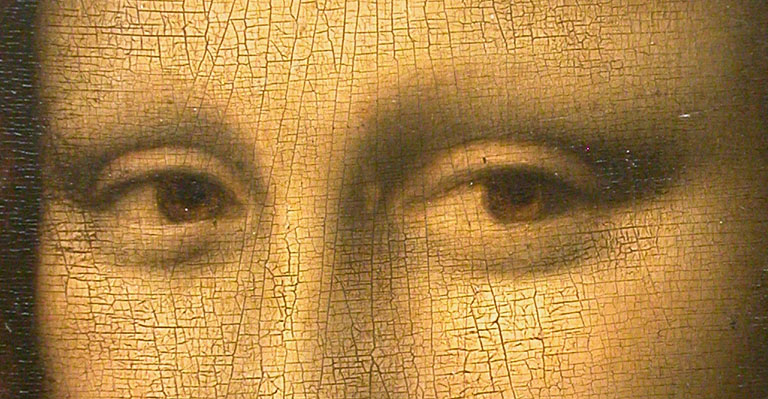
By October: Work on Mona Lisa has begun

- October – Earliest record of Leonardo da Vinci working on a portrait of Lisa del Giocondo, probably the Mona Lisa, in Florence.
- October 1 – Fort Emmanuel is christened at Cochin after Afonso de Albuquerque obtained permission to be able to build it. It is the first European fort in India, in addition to being the first Portuguese fort.
- October 18 – Pope Pius III dies less than four weeks after being elected, prompting the calling of the second papal conclave in as many months.
- October 30 – Queen Isabella I of Spain issues an edict prohibiting violence against indigenous peoples in the New World.
- November 1 – Cardinal Giuliano della Rovere, Bishop of Ostia, is elected the 216th Roman Catholic Pontiff at the end of the year's second papal conclave and takes the papal name Pope Julius II. Della Rovere had received 15 of 32 votes in the September voting for a plurality, but still short of a majority. Julius II reigns for a little more than nine years until his death in 1513.
- November 11 – Bernard Stewart, 4th Lord of Aubigny, commander of the defeated French forces and a prisoner of war since his April 21 defeat at the Battle of Seminara, is released from Castel Nuovo in Naples after a truce between France and Spain.
- November 29 – Pope Julius II, formerly Giuliano della Rovere, adds four new people to the College of Cardinals, including two members of his family, Clemente della Rovere and Galeotto della Rovere. By the time of his death, Julius will have added 27 cardinals to the Roman Catholic Church, five of them from the della Rovere family.
- December 29 – Third Italian War: The Battle of Garigliano takes place near Gaeta in Italy. Spanish forces under Gonzalo Fernández de Córdoba defeat a French–Italian mercenary army under Marchese Ludovico II of Saluzzo; the French forces, who suffer 4,000 casualties, withdraw to Gaeta.

=== Date unknown ===
- Mariotto Albertinelli paints The Visitation.
- Hieronymus Bosch works on the triptych The Garden of Earthly Delights, although other sources suggest a 1490-1510 date range for when he worked on it.
- From this year until 1660, sixteen million kilograms of silver and 185,000 kilograms of gold will enter the port of Seville.
- The Spanish explorer Juan de Bermúdez discovered the island Bermuda.

== Births ==
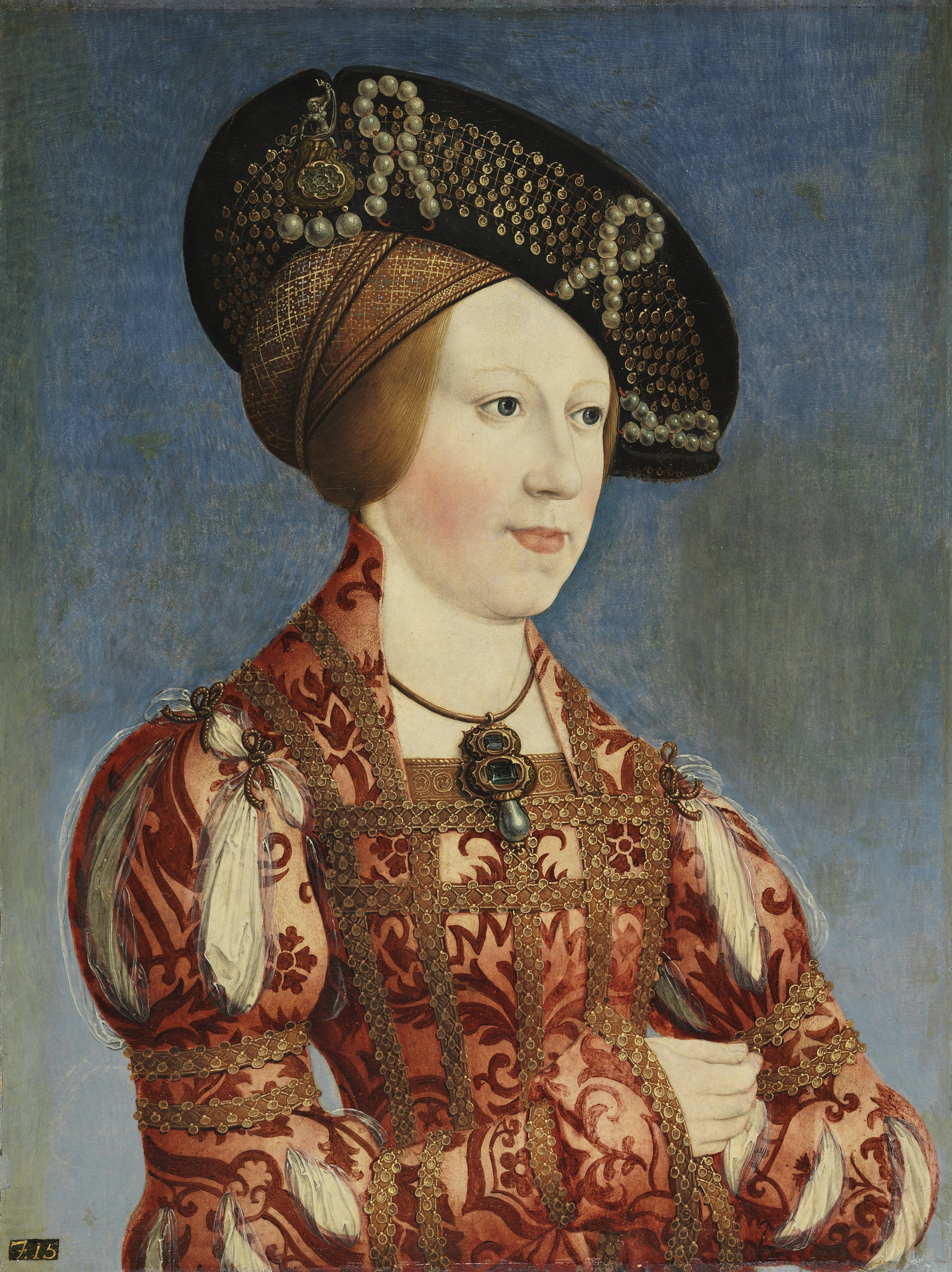
Queen Anne of Bohemia and Hungary

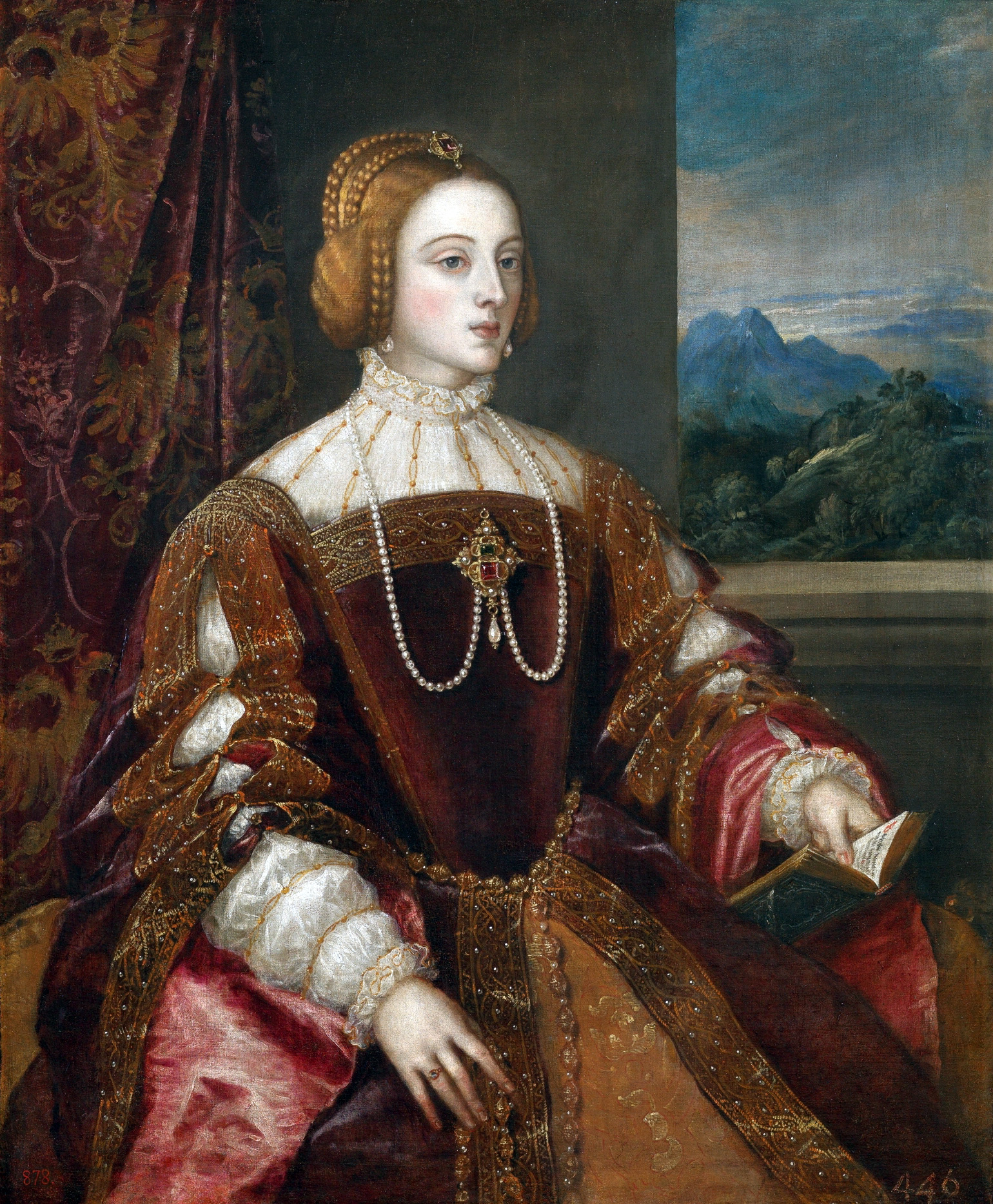
Queen Isabella of Portugal

- January 3 – Al-Mutahhar, Imam of the Zaidi state of Yemen (d. 1572)
- January 11 – Parmigianino (Girolamo Francesco Maria Mazzola), Italian artist (d. 1540)
- January 18 – Joachim of Münsterberg-Oels, Duke of Münsterberg, Duke of Oels, Count of Kladsko, Bishop of Brandenburg (d. 1562)
- February 24 – Johann Gropper, German Catholic cardinal (d. 1559)
- March 10 – Ferdinand I, Holy Roman Emperor (d. 1564)
- March 11 – George Harper, English politician (d. 1558)
- March 22 – Antonio Francesco Grazzini, Italian writer (d. 1584)
- April 6 – Jacob Micyllus, German humanist (d. 1558)
- April 18 – Henry II of Navarre, King of Navarre (1517–1555) (d. 1555)
- May 1 – Celio Secondo Curione, Italian humanist (d. 1569)
- June 1 – Wilhelm von Grumbach, German adventurer (d. 1567)
- June 28 – Giovanni della Casa, Italian poet (d. 1556)
- June 30 – John Frederick I, Elector of Saxony (d. 1554)
- July 23 – Anne of Bohemia and Hungary, Queen consort of the Romans, Bohemia and Hungary (d. 1547)
- August 12 – Christian III of Denmark and Norway (d. 1559)
- September 10 – Elisabeth of Hesse, Countess Palatine of Zweibrücken, later Countess Palatine of Simmern (d. 1563)
- October 4 – Isabella of Portugal, Queen of Spain (d. 1539)
- November 12 – Philip, Duke of Palatinate-Neuburg, German duke (d. 1548)
- November 13 – Ippolita Gonzaga, Italian nun (d. 1570)
- November 17 – Agnolo di Cosimo, Italian artist and poet (d. 1572)
- November 19 – Pier Luigi Farnese, Duke of Parma (d. 1547)
- December 14 – Michel de Nostredame, called Nostradamus, French physician and writer of Les Propheties (1555) (d. 1566)
- December 20 – Cosimo Bartoli, Italian diplomat and writer (d. 1572)
- date unknown
  - Lucas David, Prussian historian (d. 1583)
  - Robert Estienne, French printer (d. 1559)
  - John Frith, English Protestant priest and martyr (d. 1533)
  - Susannah Hornebolt, English artist (d. c. 1554)
  - Lakandula, Lakan of Tondo (d. 1589)
  - Shimazu Katsuhisa, Japanese nobleman (d. 1573)
  - Tomé de Sousa, Portuguese nobleman, first general-governor of Brazil (d. 1573 or 1579)
  - Thomas Wyatt, English lyric poet and diplomat (d. 1542)
- probable – Nicholas Bourbon, French poet

== Deaths ==
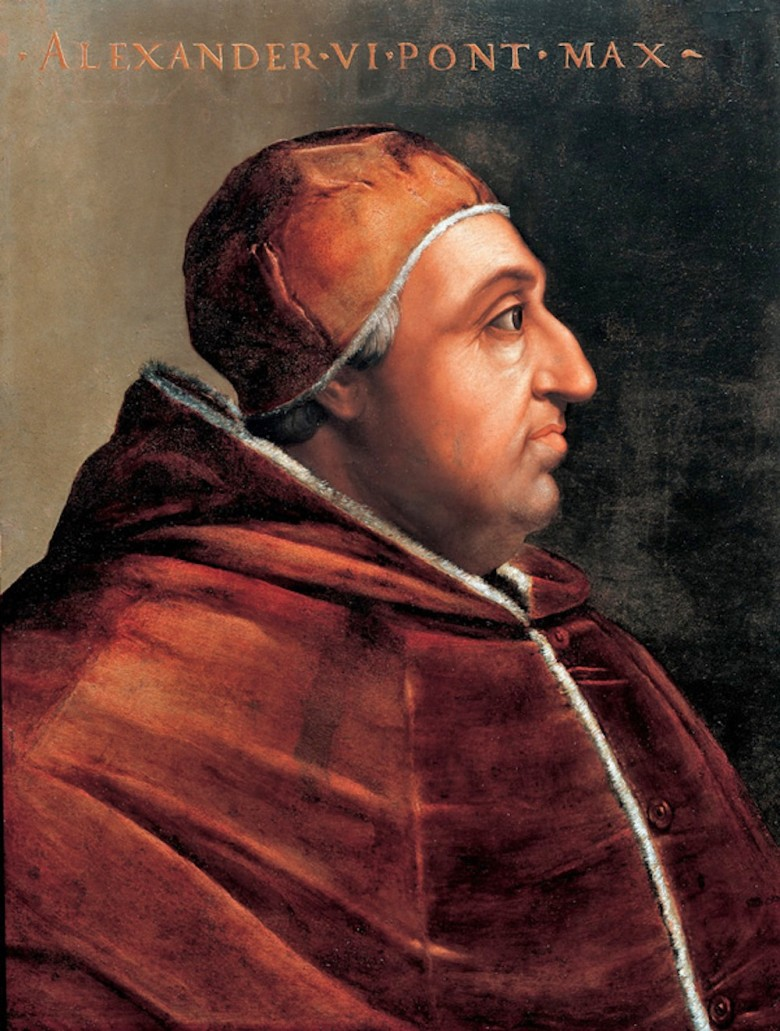
Pope Alexander VI

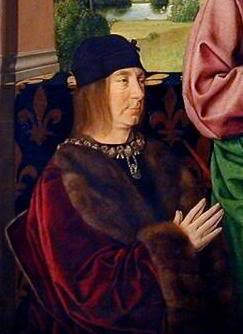
Peter II, Duke of Bourbon

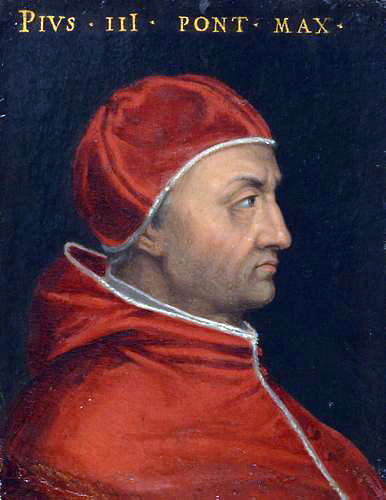
Pope Pius III

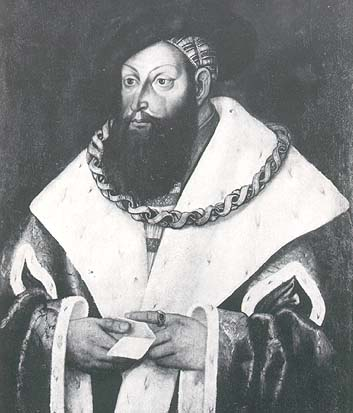
George, Duke of Bavaria

- January 20 – Ludmila of Poděbrady, Regent of the duchies of Brzeg and Oława (1488–1503) (b. 1456)
- February 11 – Elizabeth of York, queen of Henry VII of England (b. 1466)
- February 23 – Annamacharya, Indian mystic saint composer (b. 1408)
- March 14 – Frederick Jagiellon, Primate of Poland (b. 1468)
- March 16 – Edward Story, Bishop of Carlisle and Chichester
- April 7 – Sophia Palaiologina, Byzantine princess and Grand Princess of Moscow (b. 1449)
- May 20 – Lorenzo di Pierfrancesco de' Medici, Italian patron of the arts (b. 1463)
- June 2 – Clara Gonzaga, Italian noble (b. 1464)
- July 3 – Pierre d'Aubusson, Grand Master of the Knights of Rhodes (b. 1423)
- July 12 – Sophie of Mecklenburg, Duchess of Mecklenburg, Duchess of Saxony (b. 1481)
- July 24 – Louise of Savoy, Nun (b. 1461)
- August 5 – Reginald Bray, British courtier (b. 1440)
- August 12 – Anna Jagiellon, Duchess of Pomerania, Polish princess (b. 1476)
- August 18 – Pope Alexander VI (b. 1431)
- September 5 – Margaret of Hanau-Münzenberg, German noblewoman (b. 1471)
- October 10 – Peter II, Duke of Bourbon (b. 1438)
- October 18 – Pope Pius III (b. c. 1439)
- November 17 – Bona of Savoy, Duchess of Savoy (b. 1449)
- November 23 – Margaret of York, Duchess consort of Burgundy, spouse of Charles I, Duke of Burgundy (b. 1446)
- December 1 – George, Duke of Bavaria (b. 1455)
- December 14 – Sten Sture the Elder, regent of Sweden (1470–1497 and 1501–1503) (b. 1440)
- December 28 – Piero di Lorenzo de' Medici, exiled ruler of Florence (drowned) (b. 1472)
- date unknown
  - Richard Amerike, English merchant and patron of John Cabot (b. 1445)
  - Anacaona, Taino queen and poet (b. 1474)
