= Pedro de Paz (soldier) =

Spanish soldier

- Died: April 11, 1512; Ravenna, Papal States
- Military career
- Allegiance: Spanish Empire
- Service years: Unknown-1512
- Rank: Captain
- Conflicts: Ottoman–Venetian War (1499–1503); Siege of the Castle of Saint George; Italian Wars of 1499–1504; Battle of Ruvo; Battle of Cerignola; Battle of Garigliano; War of the League of Cambrai; Battle of Ravenna

Pedro de Paz (died 1512) was a Spanish captain during the Renaissance. He served under Gonzalo Fernández de Córdoba in the Italian Wars, earning fame as a skilled cavalry officer and duelist despite physical disabilities.

== Early life ==
Born in Spain, Paz, along with his cousin Carlos de Paz, joined the company of Gonzalo de Córdoba, known as the Great Captain, for the third Italian War in 1501. Described as short, hunchbacked, and deformed in head and body, Paz was often obscured by his horse and saddle in battle, prompting jests among soldiers that the horse lacked a rider. Despite this, he became a formidable light cavalry captain, renowned for his martial prowess.

== Military career ==
In March 1503, after capturing San Giovanni Rotondo, Paz and Diego Hurtado de Mendoza ambushed a French company with 300 infantry and 100 jinetes. Only 70 Swiss mercenaries escaped to a nearby tower. When they refused an honorable surrender and responded with insults, the Spaniards stormed the tower, captured them, and executed the Swiss by throwing them off the tower one by one, with Paz impaling the falling soldiers by holding a pike under them. They spared only one to recount the event. In April 1503, Paz led Spanish light cavalry with Fabrizio Colonna at the Battle of Cerignola, pursuing the French after Spanish arquebusiers broke their lines. He later harassed retreating French forces with maneuver warfare and captured Melfi. His troops mutinied over unpaid wages, requiring Diego García de Paredes to intervene. Paz also contributed to the Spanish victory at the Battle of Garigliano, which destroyed the French camp. After Córdoba’s retirement, Paz fought under Ramón de Cardona at the Battle of Ravenna in 1512, where he died alongside veteran Cristóbal Zamudio. The French won the battle but suffered heavy losses, including their general Gaston of Foix, halting their campaign.

== Legacy ==
Paz left a lasting impression on the battlefields. Giovanni Battista Cantalicio praised him in Consalvia, noting that Paz “carried Mars in his veins” and excelled at cleaving helms with his battle axe or mace, despite his peaceful surname. French chronicler Pierre de Brantôme celebrated Paz as one of Europe’s finest fighters.

== Bibliography ==
- Heros, Martín de Los (1854). Historia del conde Pedro Navarro, general de infantería, marina é ingeniero, en los reinados de Fernando e Isabel, y de doña Juana y su hijo don Carlos (in Spanish). Imprenta de la Viuda de Calero.
- Lafuente, Don Modesto (1888). Historia general de España: Tomo 5 (in Spanish). Books on Demand. ISBN 978-3-388-48089-3.
- Pidal, Pedro José (1855). Conclusion de los documentos relativos a la historia del conde Pedro Navarro (in Spanish). Imprenta de la Viuda de Calero.
