= Prospero Colonna =

Italian condottiero (1452–1523)

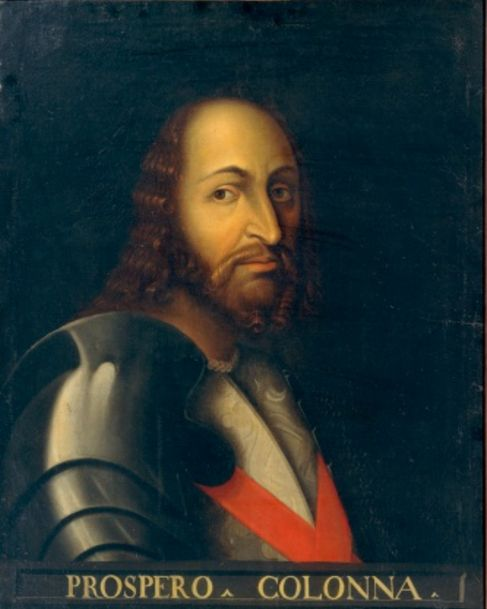
- Born: 1452; Civita Latina, Lazio, Papal States
- Died: 30 December 1523 (aged 70–71); Duchy of Milan
- Burial place: Fondi
- Military career
- Allegiance: Papal States; Kingdom of France; Duchy of Milan; Kingdom of Naples; Spanish Empire; Holy Roman Empire
- Branch: Army
- Service years: 1484-1523
- Rank: General
- Nickname: Cuntatore
- Conflicts: War of Ferrara; Battle of Campomorto; Italian Wars of 1499–1504; Battle of Cerignola; Battle of Ruvo; Battle of Garigliano; War of the League of Cambrai; Battle of La Motta; Siege of Crema; Italian War of 1521–1526; Battle of Vaprio d'Adda; Battle of Bicocca; Siege of Genoa; Siege of Milan

Prospero Colonna (1452 – 30 December 1523), sometimes referred to as Prosper Colonna, was an Italian condottiero. His military career spanned 40 years, serving French royals, Kings of Naples, Dukes of Milan, Popes, the Catholic Monarchs of Spain and Charles V, Holy Roman Emperor, being especially active at the first stage of the Italian Wars.

Along with his rival Bartolomeo d'Alviano, Colonna was considered the best Italian general of his age. For his prowess at defensive and counteroffensive warfare, which included impactful victories like Cerignola, Bicocca and Milan, he was regarded as the new Quintus Fabius Maximus Cunctator, earning the nickname Cuntatore. His connections and career allowed him to become a great feudal lord in the Spanish viceroyalty of Naples.

== Early life ==
A member of the ancient noble family of the Colonna, he was born in Civita Lavinia, near Velletri (Lazio), in 1452. He was a cousin of Fabrizio Colonna.

== Career ==
=== Beginnings ===
His first notable action as a military leader was in 1484 when he defended the family castle of Paliano against an assault by the rival Orsini and Riario families. After some other battle deeds, Prospero, who had joined Cardinal Giuliano della Rovere's party, was imprisoned in Castel Sant'Angelo (Rome) by Pope Alexander VI. Once freed, he was soon imprisoned again for his allegiance to Charles VIII of France during his invasion of Italy. In the end, the King of France was victorious against the Pope and entered Rome, backed by Prospero and Fabrizio Colonna, in 1495.

During the brief French rule over the Kingdom of Naples, Prospero obtained the duchy of Traetto and the county of Forlì. However, when Charles returned beyond the Alps, Prospero helped King Ferdinand II of Naples to evict the French viceroy from Naples.

The situation changed again with the new French invasion of Louis XII. While the Neapolitan king Frederick IV fled to the island of Ischia, Fabrizio and Prospero Colonna tried to defend the kingdom., but were defeated and imprisoned in the Castel Nuovo of Naples. They were also excommunicated by Alexander VI, who took their castles in the Lazio. Eventually ransomed, both cousins then introduced themselves to the Spanish general Gonzalo Fernández de Córdoba, the "Great Captain", and entered the service of the Catholic Monarchs of Spain. They were followed by Diego García de Paredes, a Spaniard working for the Colonna family.

=== Third Italian War ===
Prospero and Fabrizio became an instrumental part of the Great Captain's army. They participated in the second Challenge of Barletta in 1503, in which Italian soldiers led by Ettore Fieramosca defeated French knights led by Charles de Torgues, and were also part of the Spanish contingent during the quick Battle of Ruvo. After Fernando de Andrade defeated the French in Seminara, the Great Captain abandoned Barletta and crossed the Ofanto, establishing a in Cerignola which Colonna helped fortifying. During the subsequent Battle of Cerignola, the French general Louis d'Armagnac was felled by arquebusiers, after which cavalry finished the French army. Colonna pursued the remnants of the French to their camp with part of their heavy cavalry, and he and his entourage allowed themselves to sleep in d'Armagnac's tent, causing worry among the Spanish when they didn't return until next morning.

After taking Capua and the city of Naples, Córdoba besieged Gaeta, but he lifted the siege and strategically moved to Mola. Due to the death of Pope Alexander VI in August, Colonna and Diego de Mendoza were sent to offer their condolences and negotiate with Cesare Borgia, who had offered to ally with Spain. Borgia secretly sided with France and attempted to deceive Colonna and Mendoza into being captured by the French, but they realized the ruse and prepared for a brawl, forcing Borgia to negotiate to get them free pass to leave.

He returned to join the Great Captain after the French and Spanish armies had taken positions at both sides of the Garigliano river. The Spanish had been reinforced by Bartolomeo d'Alviano, a condottiero from the Orsini family and an old rival to Colonna, who assisted the Great Captain and Prospero at assaulting the French positions during the Battle of Garigliano. The French surrendered afterwards, and Colonna recovered his former feud in Fondi. He received offers from the Republic of Florence to lead their armies, but he stayed in the service of Spain, being entrusted with taking the captured Cesare Borgia to the peninsula. He acted also as a liaison with another of the Great Captain's allies, Isabella of Aragon, Duchess of Milan.

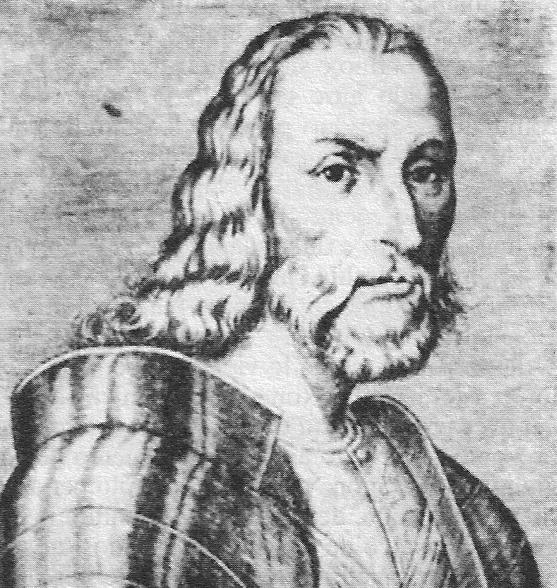
Colonna's portrait, unknown year

=== Interim years ===
His friendship with the Great Captain, now Viceroy of Naples, soured by the presence of Bartolomeo d'Alviano, whom Córdoba held as an advisor. After the death of Queen Isabella, Córdoba's main benefactor in the Spanish court, Colonna secretly slandered him to King Ferdinand, warning about the enormous Italian support to the viceroy and how easy it would be for him to revolt and take Naples for himself. When Córdoba found about this, he distanced himself from Colonna. Nonetheless, after Diego García de Paredes issued a challenge to two anonymous slanderers of Great Captain, Colonna stated that Bartolomeo d'Alviano and himself would fight along with Paredes and not against him. Two other gentlemen present in the scene would die shortly after among suspicions of murder.

In 1506, Bartolomeo d'Alviano was expelled from the Spanish army after attacking the lands of the Colonna family, and with the recalling of the Great Captain in 1507, Colonna was left as King Ferdinand's main local deputy in Italy. Around this time, he added Itri, Sperlonga, Ceccano, and Sonnino to his fiefs, and was also able to take back his territories in the Lazio after the Pope's death, becoming once again a great feudal lord in southern Italy.

=== War of the League of Cambrai ===
In 1508, with the formation of the League of Cambrai against the Republic of Venice, Colonna found himself again pitted against Bartolomeo d'Alviano, who had been hired by the Venetians. Prospero himself had been tempted to join Venice in exchange for the duchy of Urbino, over which Fabrizio Colonna held right by marriage, but they had stayed in Ferdinand's service. After Venice suffered a crushing defeat in the Battle of Agnadello, Colonna assisted the new Viceroy of Naples, Ramón de Cardona, in taking the Venetian colonies of Monopoli, Mola, Polignano and Trani. In 1510 Colonna also reconciled with the Great Captain, whom he visited in Córdoba.

When the League of Cambrai switched their target to France in 1511, Colonna refused to serve in a Spanish and Papal army commanded by Cardona, as King Ferdinand had originally promised Colonna supreme command of his armies in Italy. Colonna retired to Genazzano and stayed out of the events, including the Battle of Ravenna, where Cardona was defeated and Fabrizio was captured. He eventually returned in autumn under much pressure by Pope Julius II and Cardinal Francisco de Remolins, rejoining the Spanish in the Po and being appointed captain general of Milan under Maximilian Sforza.

The following year, France and Venice allied, but a first invading army was routed by Swiss and Milanese forces in the Battle of Novara, after which Colonna joined his nephew Fernando d'Ávalos and Viceroy Ramón de Cardona in route to invade Venice. Reinforced by a German contingent under Georg von Frundsberg, the coalition forced Bartolomeo d'Alviano to retreat to Padua and devastated the Venetian hinterland, to the extent of firing shots against the walls of the city, but lacking means to besiege it, they turned back to Bartolomeo, finding him waiting for them with a large ambush prepared. With the help of Colonna, however, the allied army undid the ambush and defeated Bartolomeo during the Battle of La Motta.

In August 1514, Colonna led a Spanish army along with a Milanese force under Silvio Savelli to besiege Crema, a Venecian colony, but the defenders, led by Renzo da Ceri, destroyed the Milanese camp and forced Colonna to retreat to Romanengo. In November, however, Savelli and Colonna forced Ceri to surrender in Bergamo.

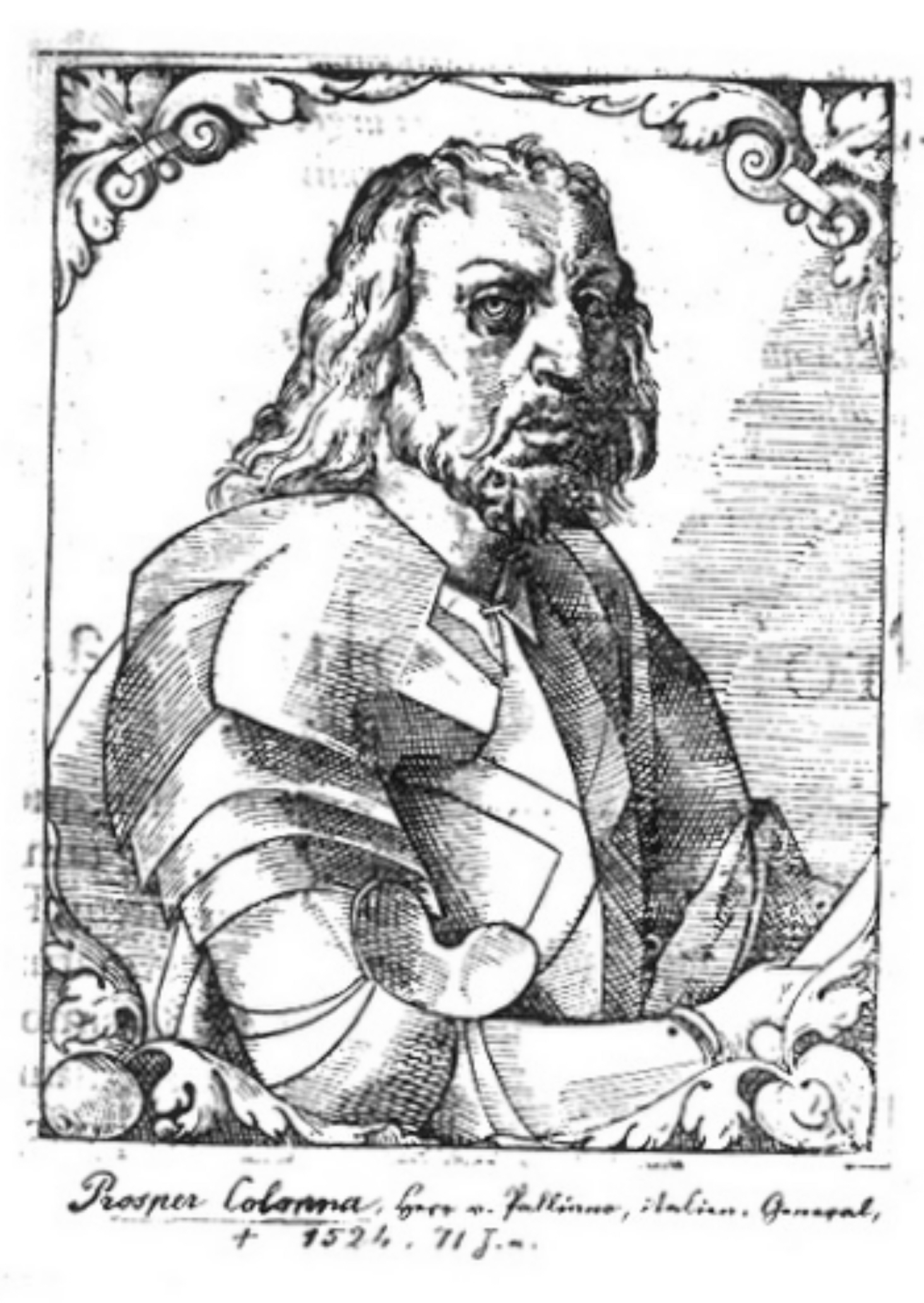
Prospero Colonna, 1575

In winter, Colonna and Cardona traveled to Innsbruck to meet with Holy Roman Emperor Maximilian I, whose grandson Charles would inherit the thrones of Spain and Naples. King Louis XII of France had died, being succeeded by Francis I, which had his sights on Milan and would cause the alliance against France to be renewed. Colonna was required to commanded the Milanese and Papal forces in north-western Italy, blocking the mountain passes towards Milan with the help of the Swiss Confederacy.

==== Capture and release ====
In 1515, Colonna directed the defense against the French near Villafranc. However, French general Jacques de la Palice surprised him by going through the pass of Argentera, considered unpassable for any sizable army, but accessible to him by the engineering of Colonna's old colleague Pedro Navarro, now in the service of France. From his position, Colonna discovered the enemies and wrongly believed they could only be small groups, but the rest of them, captained by Pierre Terrail, seigneur de Bayard, performed a two-pronged attack against him and captured Colonna and his staff in his own house in a surprising and humiliating raid. This was considered one of the greatest military twists of their time, compared to the crossing of the Alps by Hannibal.

Milanese condottiero Gian Giacomo Trivulzio, who served the French and had previously been defeated by Colonna in another of their encounters in opposing sides, taunted him for his fate while Colonna was being taken to France, to which Colonna replied jokingly, "It is a country I have always wanted to visit".

Meanwhile, Francis I defeated the Swiss in the Battle of Marignano and took over their confederacy. Colonna was freed in March of the following year, with Francis I himself paying half of his rescue of 45,000 ducats. Francis did it as gesture towards a renowned general like him on the condition Colonna did not wage war against France again, but Colonna had no intention to honor this promise. The Italian looked to resume action in Lombardy, but Spanish participation in the war ended in August, preventing him from achieving revenge for his capture.

He passed the next two years of peace busy with European politics from Naples, where he was a lover of Isabella d'Aragona. In 1518, due to the arranged marriage between King Sigismund I of Poland and Isabella's daughter Bona Sforza, Colonna organized the ceremony in Naples, and later escorted the couple to Kraków. He also visited King Charles in Spain representing the Neapolitan nobility.

=== Four Years' War ===
In 1521, he was at the service of now King of Spain and Holy Roman Emperor Charles V. With the beginning of the Four Years' War, he was chosen by Charles and Pope Leo X as the commander of the combined Imperial-Spanish and Papal troops, leading the effort against France and Venice. Colonna joined forces with d'Ávalos and the Papal representative Federico II Gonzaga, Duke of Mantua, as well as Giovanni delle Bande Nere, but coordination among the four was not easy at first, forcing them to abandon the siege of Parma, with Colonna coming to the extent of challenging the much younger Giovanni to a duel.

Once they reached an agreement and reorganized their forces, Colonna and his lieutenants pushed the French general Odet of Foix, Viscount of Lautrec towards Milan after the Battle of Vaprio d'Adda, and once there they conquered the duchy, capturing the Venetian Teodoro Trivulzio (a nephew to Gian Giacomo) and enthroning Francesco II Sforza as the new Duke of Milan. The people of Parma handed the city to the Papal troops shortly after.

In January 1522, Leo X died and was replaced by Adrian VI. Lautrec gathered reinforcements from Jacques de la Palice, Anne de Montmorency and Francesco Maria I della Rovere, and returned from his refuge in Cremona and attempted to reconquer Milan. Even then, he failed to defeat Colonna's defenses in Milan and Pavia, forcing him to retreat south. The French army included Giovanni delle Bande Nere, who had changed sides, and Colonna's own nephew, Marcantonio, who was killed by cannonfire while spying the Milanese fortifications. After receiving his corpse, Prospero would state: "gentlemen, I cry not because of the death of my brother [sic] Marcantonio, but because he died in the service of my greatest enemy".

Colonna eventually left Milan and engaged Giovanni and Lautrec in a series of marches and countermarches in northern Italy, eventually facing off with them and achieving a decisive Imperial-Spanish and Papal victory in the subsequent Battle of Bicocca in April. In its course, Colonna capitazlied greatly on the power of well places fortifications, while Fernando d'Ávalos employed volley fire, decimating the Swiss pikemen. The result was effective enough that bicoca became a Spanish idiom for an easily achieved success.

Colonna and d'Ávalos followed by besieging Genoa in May, defeating the attempts by admiral Andrea Doria of relieving the city. Its dux Ottaviano Fregoso attempted to negotiate, but at that point d'Ávalos' men breached the walls, leading the city to be sacked. Pedro Navarro was captured in the city. As the French forces in the Piedmont retreated back to France, Colonna returned to Lombardy, where he sent Pescara to conquer Iseo, the last French bulwark in the zone, submitting his old rival Gian Giacomo Trivulzio and placing Gian Giacomo Medici in command. By this point, with the French almost completely evicted from Italy, Colonna passed the winter in Milan. Adrian VI complained when he found out Colonna and the Imperial army were plundering the resources of Parma, but Spanish ambassador Luis Fernández de Córdoba convinced the Pope to relent.

His success infuriated King Francis I of France, who vowed to come personally to Italy in 1523 before being delegating on Guillaume Gouffier, seigneur de Bonnivet due to the betrayal of Charles of Bourbon. Finding about it through spies, Colonna warned the emperor and gathered reinforcements from the Holy Roman Empire and Italy, and moved to Milan, which he successfully defended from Bonnivet's army. Harassed by Colonna's Fabian tactics, Bonnivet eventually asked for a truce, which was negotiated by Galeazzo II Visconti, providentially father to one of Colonna's lovers. The French eventually lifted the siege and retreated to Abbiategrasso, but Colonna's health was declining, and he died in 1523 in l'Hôtel Clemenceau at Milan.

== Legacy ==
His death was deeply felt in the Spanish and Italian armies of Charles V. Soldier and chronicler Martín García Cereceda, who served under Colonna in last years, lauded him as a "brave captain and very wise warrior". Francesco Guicciardini, who put him as the foremost Italian strategist of his time along with Bartolomeo d'Alviano, credited Colonna with the ability to defeat his enemies through defense, prudency and an intelligent usage of his advantages, rather than through direct fighting. He was held as the father of the arte del difendere, based on defensive and counteroffensive strategy, in opposition to the arte dell' offendere, based on aggression. Due to this, he was regarded as a new Quintus Fabius Maximus Cunctator, earning the nickname Cuntatore. Along with his nephew Fernando d'Ávalos, Marquis of Pescara, Colonna is considered one of the two main successors of Gonzalo Fernández de Córdoba, forming part of what has been called the "Hispano-Italian School".

== Issue ==
He married Covella di Sanseverino, who gave him an heir, Vespasiano.

Confident in the constancy of the lady of his affections, Prospero took for his companion a gentleman of low degree, to whom she, unfortunately, transferred the love he thought was his own. Feeling that he had been the author of his own ruin, Prospero took for device the bull of Perillus, which had proved the death of its inventor, with the motto, Ingenio experior funera digna meo, "I suffer a death befitting my invention."

== Bibliography ==
- Benassi, Umberto (1899). Storia di Parma. Cornell University.
- García Cereceda, Martín, Tratado de las compañas y otros acontecimientos de los ejércitos del Emperador, 1873
- Martínez Laínez, Fernando; Sánchez de Toca, José María (2021). El Gran Capitán. EDAF. ISBN 9788441441224.
- Urban, William (2011). Matchlocks to Flintlocks: Warfare in Europe and Beyond, 1500–1700. Pen & Sword. ISBN 9781781599426.
