= 1509 in Italy =

List of years in Italy
- … 1499; 1500; 1501; 1502; 1503; 1504; 1505; 1506; 1507; 1508; 1509; 1510; 1511; 1512; 1513; 1514; 1515; 1516; 1517; 1518; 1519 …
- Art; Archaeology; Architecture; Literature; Music; Philosophy; Science; +...

An incomplete series of events, births and deaths which occurred in Italy in 1509:

- Battle of Agnadello

The Battle of Agnadello, also known as Vailà, was one of the more significant battles of the War of the League of Cambrai, and one of the major battles of the Italian Wars.

- Battle of Polesella

The Battle of Polesella, fought on December 22, 1509, by forces of the Duchy of Ferrara and the Republic of Venice, was a naval battle on the River Po in the War of the League of Cambrai in the Italian Wars. It was an overwhelming victory for Ferrara.

- Siege of Padua

The Siege of Padua was a major engagement early in the War of the League of Cambrai.

== Births ==
- Bernardino Telesio
- Ippolito II d'Este
- Giovanni Morone

== Deaths ==
- Pietro del Donzello
- Vicino da Ferrara
- Giovanni Cavalcanti (poet)
