= Diego García de Paredes =

Spanish soldier, mercenary, and duellist (1468–1533)

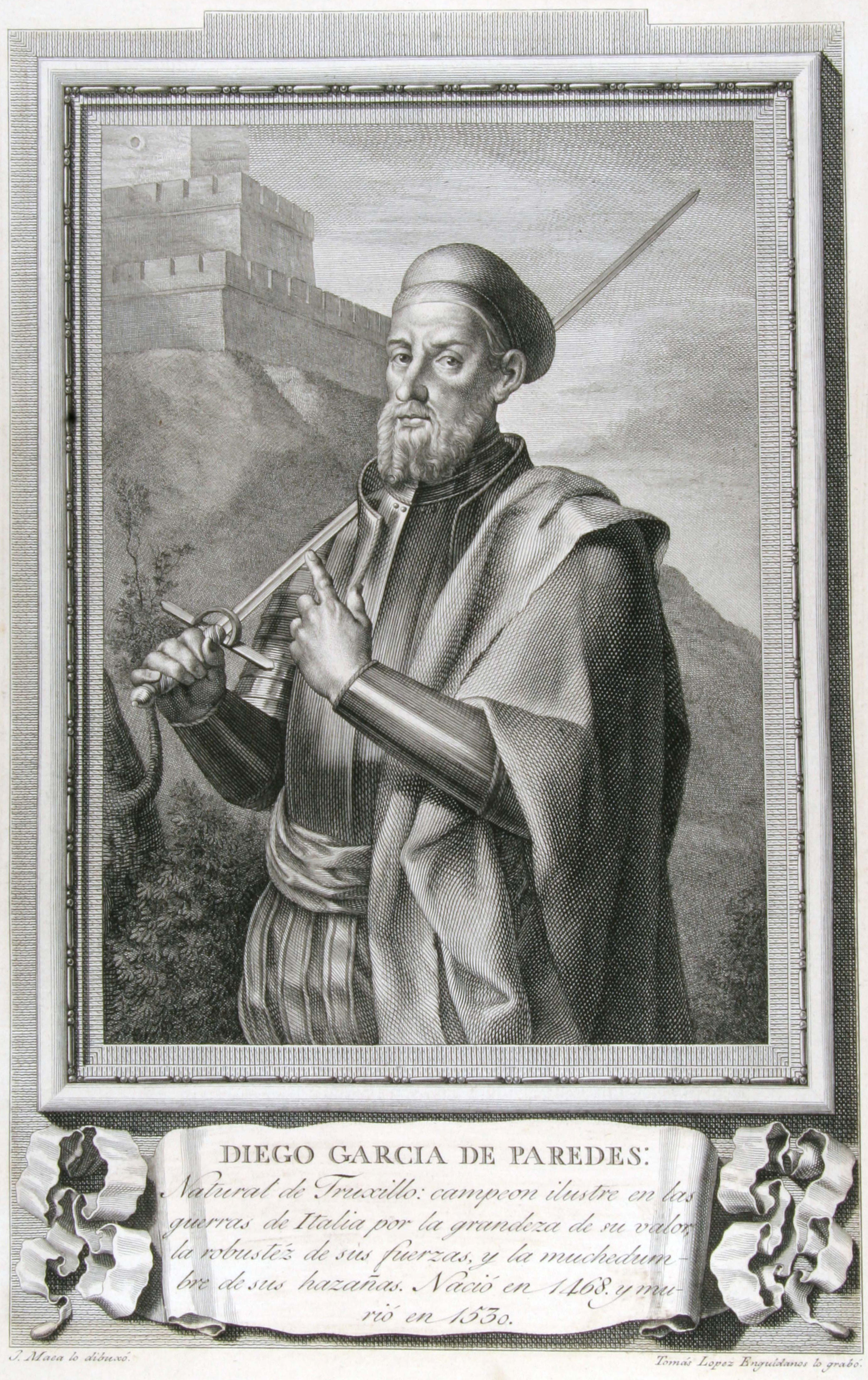
- Born: 30 March 1468; Trujillo, Crown of Castile
- Died: 15 February 1533 (aged 64); Bolonia, Papal States
- Military career
- Allegiance: Spain
- Service years: 1485–1533
- Rank: Maestre de campo
- Nicknames: El Sansón de Extremadura ("The Extremaduran Samson"); El Hércules de España ("The Spanish Hercules")
- Conflicts: Granada War; 3rd Turkish-Venetian War; Kefalonia (1500); 2nd Italian War; Ruvo (1503); Cerignola (1503); Garigliano (1503); War of League of Cambrai; Battle of Ravenna (1512); Battle of La Motta (1513); Italian War of 1521–1526; Battle of Noáin (1521); Siege of Fuenterrabía (1523)
- Awards: Order of the Golden Spur
- Other work: Marquis of Colonetta (1504–1507)

Diego García de Paredes (1468–1533) was a Spanish soldier, mercenary and duelist. He played a distinguished role in the Spanish armies during the Italian Wars, the Mediterranean conflicts against the Ottoman Empire, and the early wars of Emperor Charles V. Known as the "Extremaduran Samson" and the "Spanish Hercules", he was celebrated by his great strength, battle feats and long history of duels, eventually becoming a figure of legend in the Spanish and Italian armies.

== Early life ==
He was born in Trujillo, Extremadura, which lies between Badajoz and Madrid. It produced many of the most noted conquistadores of America, including the Pizarro family. Information is scarce about his upbringing, but it is known he learned to read and write and was trained in military arts by his father, in which he proved so strong and talented that he routinely defeated all of his training partners. He especially admired Julius Caesar, whose Commentaries on the Gallic War later inspired him to write his own memoiers, which he dedicated to his second son.

He might have served as a teenager in the Granada War, but either way, the conquest of the last Muslim stronghold and the end of hostilities in Spain drove him and his half-brother Álvaro to start a career abroad as mercenaries. Before leaving, Diego had a street brawl over a horse with his relative, Ruy Sánchez de Vargas, who ambushed him with three horsemen. Despite being alone, he killed them all.

== Career ==
=== Mercenary in Italy ===
They landed in 1496 in Naples, where according to Paredes himself, they temporally survived by challenging street thugs and stealing their belongings after killing them. Eventually, they contacted their relative, Cardinal Bernardino López de Carvajal, a favorite of Pope Alexander VI who was in conflict with the barons of the Romagna and took Diego and Álvaro into his service. The brothers were later promoted to Papal troops and moved to the Castel Sant'Angelo, reportedly because the Pope was impressed by an earlier street brawl where Diego and Álvaro, along with Gonzalo Pizarro Sr. and four other Spaniards, defeated an entire squad of Papal soldiers, "killing five, mauling ten, and leaving all the rest well battered and knocked out", with Diego not wielding a sword, but a heavy iron bar used in a weight throw game called tirar a la barra.

The Pope's son Cesare Borgia recruited García to drown a revolt in Montefiascone, in which the Spaniard infiltrated the citadel by night and pried off the gate's locks with his enormous strength, letting the rest of the army in to take the castle easily.

In 1500, in midst of the war between the Borgias and Guidobaldo da Montefeltro, Duke of Urbino, García was expelled from the Papal army after dueling and killing Italian captain Cesare Romano, who had insulted Garcia for shouting the name of Spain during a battle. As Paredes himself admits in a brief autobiography, Romano had openly surrendered, but the Spaniard pretended not to hear his pleas and beheaded him. Paredes was imprisoned, but he broke out of his cell and killed multiple guards with a stolen halberd before escaping.

He pledged his loyalty to the Duke of Urbino, advising him on how to defeat the Papal army. Paredes performed a ruse in which he disguised himself and 1,000 arquebusiers as Venetian soldiers coming to reinforce the Papal camp, thanks to which they entered freely, captured easily the camp and, after changing disguises, ambushed the real Venetian reinforcements. He then offered his services to the Colonna family, serving briefly under Prospero Colonna before reuniting with the Spanish army under the "Great Captain", Gonzalo Fernández de Córdoba.

=== Cephalonia and return to Rome ===
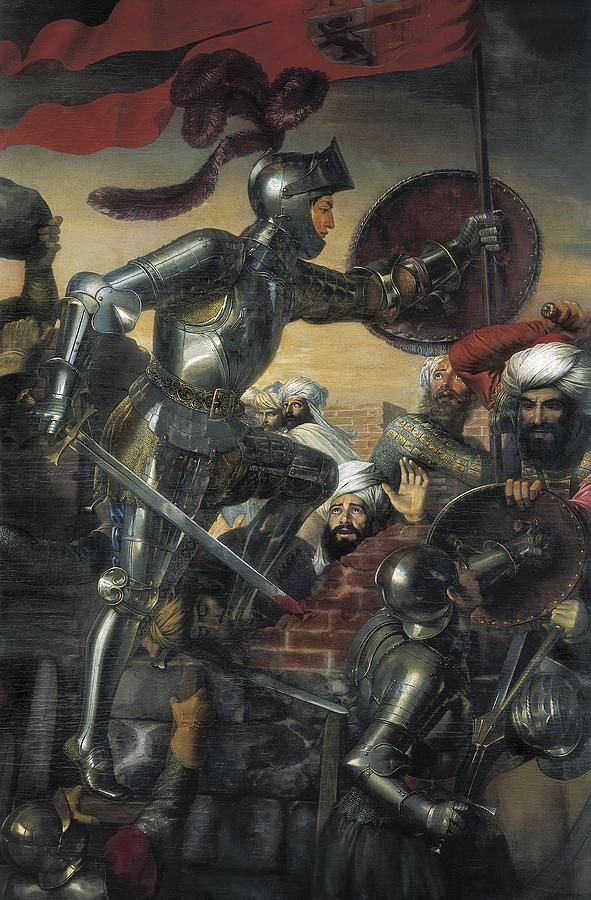
Gonzalo Fernández de Córdoba assaulting the Muslim stronghold of Montefrío. José de Madrazo, unknown year.

As part of Córdoba's army, Paredes fought in the 1500 expedition to retake the Venetian island of Cephalonia from the Ottoman Empire. During the subsequent siege of the Castle of Saint George, the Turks used an especially designed crane to hoist enemy soldiers and capture them or drop them to their deaths, and Paredes was one of the men caught by the engine. However, he held on to the hook and let himself be taken to the enemy wall, and once there he attacked fiercely the Ottoman soldiers, repealing the castle's garrison during three entire days and taking down many of them until being finally captured by exhaustion and hunger. Paredes capitalized on his imprisonment in the fortress to recover, and as soon as he heard the Spaniards assaulting the walls again, he broke his chains, seized weapons and started fighting the Turks from the inside, eventually helping the rest of the army take the castle.

Paredes' role in the battle increased his fame until becoming a legend in his time. It was claimed that he had killed as many enemies in Cephalonia as the rest of the army did put together, and he was granted the nicknames of El Sansón de Extremadura ("The Extremaduran Samson") and El Hércules de España ("The Spanish Hercules") for his incredible strength and battle prowess.

After returning to the Spanish home base of Sicily, García found himself inactive again, so he went back to work as a mercenary in mainland Italy. Despite his earlier betrayal, he was welcomed by Cesare Borgia due to his newfound renown, being appointed colonel of his armies and undertaking campaigns in Rimini, Fosara and Faenza. However, this stint was short-lived, as Spanish army called him back with the outbreak of the Third Italian War.

=== Naples War ===
The war between Ferdinand V of Castile and Louis XII of France saw García being drafted again to the armies of Gonzalo Fernández de Córdoba in 1502. The Spaniards were initially pushed back, and Córdoba ordered the army to make the city Barletta their headquarters while waiting for reinforcements. In the meanwhile, diplomacy with the French led to a knightly contest in September, which granted Paredes a new chance to show his abilities. The enemy contingent included the famed Pierre Terrail, seigneur de Bayard.

The challenge, which came to be known as the Challenge of Barletta (not to be confused with the following's year Challenge of Barletta), took place on September 20 and pitted eleven French men-at-arms led by Pierre Terrail against eleven Spanish soldiers led by artillery captain Diego de Vera, all fighting on horse. During the course of a five-hour battle, despite their lesser familiarity with the knightly rules, the Iberians eventually got the advantage, killing the French horses and one of their men, and pressing them to the point of forcing the knights to use the dead animals as an improvised wall. As the Spaniards failed to penetrate their defenses, the judges proposed to end the contest as a draw, but Paredes refused and stated that only by death he would leave the battlefield. Having broken both his lance and his sword, he started seizing the field's heavy boundary stones and pelting the French knights with them, allowing his partners to attack during the confusion and finally force the French to run away from the field. Still, the judges ultimately decreed a draw, praising the Spaniards for their fighting skill and the French for their resistance.

His role in the battle was echoed, with poet Manuel José Quintana comparing it to "the heroic battles in Homer and Virgil, when broken the lances and swords, they came to attack each other with large stones that many people could not lift with all their effort." Paredes further distinguished himself in their victory over the French in the Battle of Cerignola, and shortly after, in the months previous to the more instrumental Battle of the Garigliano, he found himself starring in yet another memorable showing.

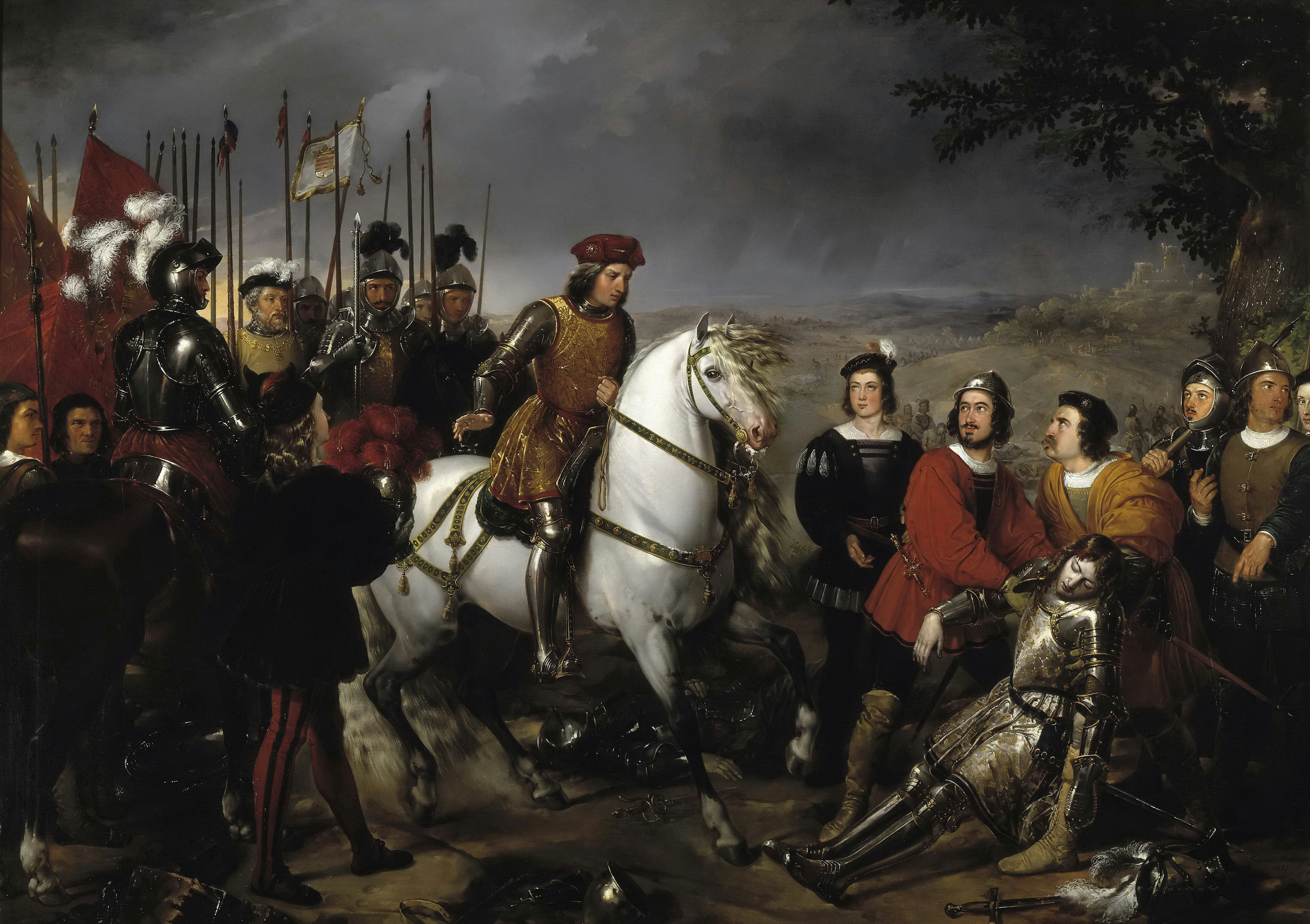
Spanish victory at Cerignola. Federico de Madrazo, 1835.

During the impasse between the Spanish and French armies at both sides of the Garigliano river, Paredes advised Córdoba to engage action, but the general, being ill at the time and waiting for more reinforcements, preferred to stay put. His rebuttal offended Paredes, who promptly went alone to the river and, arming himself with a montante and placing himself in a narrow bridge, challenged the French. Paredes began fighting alone all the nearby French, who flocked to the bridge to reach him yet were continuously cut down by the Spaniard, capitalizing on the passage's narrowness to prevent them from surround him. The brawl got out of control and summoned both armies to the river, with the French bringing their artillery against them, after which Paredes' comrades finally managed to drag him back to the safety of their lines. They supposedly left behind around 500 French soldiers either killed by his hand or drowned in the river in the attempt to escape from him.

Either real or exaggerated, the anecdote only added to Paredes' legend. Chronicler Hernán Pérez del Pulgar, a contemporaneous to Gonzalo de Córdoba, described it as, "...with the two-handed longsword he got himself among them, and fighting like a brave lion he started making such proof of his might that it was never surpassed by Hector and Julius Caesar, nor Alexander the Great and other ancient brave captains, looking truthfully like another Horatius in his effort and spirit." Still, Córdoba scolded Paredes for his insubordination and recklessness, and the fact that García got out of the stunt almost unhurt was considered a miracle.

This and his role in the Battle of the Garigliano led the French to call García Le Grand Diable ("The Great Devil"). The name was possibly first given to him by Francesco II Gonzaga, Marquis of Mantua, an ally to the French, who barely missed being struck down by Paredes' halberd during the battle and was forced to flee on horse. The war concluded in Spanish victory in the 1505 Treaty of Lyon.

=== War of the League of Cambrai ===
Córdoba had given Paredes the Marquisate of Colonnetta after their victory in 1504, which he retained during his role in the capture of Mers-el-Kébir and other battles in Africa, but he would lose it three years later when Córdoba fell out of favor in Ferdinand's court. Disappointed by the treatment given to Córdoba and himself, Paredes left the army and became a pirate with the secret support of another of their comrades, famed admiral Juan de Lezcano. He attacked ships and ports of any nationality, including Spanish, which got a bounty placed on him, although he especially focused on French and Muslim prey. With the death of Ferdinand, he was pardoned and welcomed back to service, partaking in the conquest of Oran commanded by another of Córdoba's underlings, Pedro Navarro.

Paredes balanced his participation in the Spanish conquests in Northern Africa with a more international role, being handpicked by Maximilian I, Holy Roman Emperor to head a portion of the forces of the League of Cambrai, and later by Pope Julius II for his 1511 Holy League.

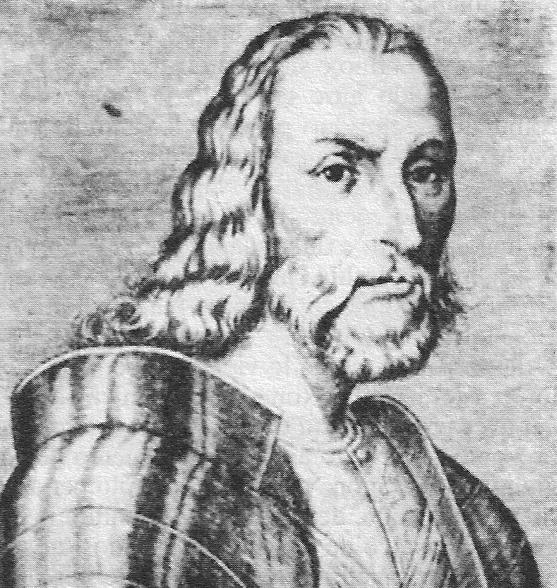
Prospero Colonna, under whom Paredes served several times.

He fought in the ill-fated Battle of Ravenna, where his brother Álvaro García was killed. Paredes was later captured in a French ambush after receiving three musket wounds, but he escaped by throwing himself off a bridge along with the four knights who were necessary to drag him, swimming away while they drowned. He reached the safety of Prospero Colonna's allied camp, where he recovered, but two months later he was challenged by a Spanish captain, Bartolomé Palomino, who blamed him for the death of many of his comrades while solely he escaped. The two dueled, and although Paredes was wounded early in an arm, one of his own strikes amputated Palomino's limb. The latter refused to surrender and wielded the sword with his other hand, but García took him down and was ready to behead him before the judges intervened to grant Paredes the victory.

In 1513, García took part in another knightly battle, which included his old partner Gonzalo Pizarro and an Alvarado (identified as a relative to future conquistador Pedro de Alvarado). The Spaniards won again, with Paredes personally killing two French knights who happened to be brothers, leading later to a third brother challenging Paredes to a singles duel. Being the receptor of the challenge, García required the duel to be fought with two large iron maces he produced. The Frenchman discovered he could not properly lift his mace and instead attacked Paredes illegally with his sword, wounding him in the hip, but Paredes could easily swing around his own mace and quickly struck the knight in the head, killing him. Only a few days later, the Battle of La Motta gave Colonna, Paredes and the Spaniards victory over the French.

=== Four Years' War and last days ===
Paredes returned briefly to Extremadura, where he featured another colourful anecdote. While waiting in an inn in Coria, wearing a papahigo (balaclava) in order not to be recognized, he was harassed by a gang of pimps and prostitutes who suspected him to be a Jew. Paredes answered by throwing them into the inn's hearth, where one of the women burned to death. The survivors gathered a mob of villagers, surrounded the inn and threatened him with burning it down, but everything was sorted out when Paredes revealed his identity.

In 1520, Paredes was drafted into the guard of Charles V, Holy Roman Emperor and King of Spain. He fought in the Four Years' War against France, participating mainly in the Spanish conquest of Iberian Navarre. Poet Luis Zapata de Chaves claimed García fought in the Battle of Pavia, after which he would have been tasked with watching over the captured King Francis I of France, although this is unproven. Paredes would also partake in some skirmishes against the Ottomans on the Danube as well, and might or might not also have been present in the 1529 Siege of Vienna.

Upon Charles' return to Italy, García suffered an attempt of his life by an entire company of enemies while guarding the rear of the imperial entourage. Receiving four musquet wounds, the Spaniard was forced to barricade himself with his young son Sancho and their servants in a guest house, where he killed ten attackers trying to break in before the imperial guard rescued them. He remained in the service of Charles V during the War of the League of Cognac.

== Death ==
García died in Bologna during the peacetime of 1534, by a fall while engaged in a game with some younger officers in which they had to kick a stick placed on a high wall. He wrote the Brief Summary of his life and deeds on his deathbed, noting in it the irony of his unheroic death, but exhorting his son Sancho to cultivate martial virtue in his example. His body was carried to his native town Trujillo, and buried in the church of Santa María la Mayor in 1545.

He never commanded an army or rose to the position of a general, but he was a notable figure in the wars of the end of the 15th and beginning of the 16th century, when personal prowess had still a considerable share in deciding combat. His strength, daring, and activity fitted him to shine in operations largely composed of night marches, escalades, surprises and hand-to-hand combat. He was reputed to be undisputed in over 300 singles duels. In his Brief Summary, later printed at the end of the Chronicle of the Great Captain, published in 1584 at Alcalá de Henares, Paredes modestly lays no claim to having done more than was open to a very athletic man.

== Issue ==
He had an illegitimate son named Diego (b. 1506), whom Paredes raised nonetheless. Father and son were alleged to have a fearsome reputation alike in Trujillo. He later married María de Sotomayor, although the marriage was unhappy, with a pregnant Sotomayor accusing Paredes in 1518 of mistreating Diego, using magic on her and forcing her to live a cloistered life. The case was dubious and was eventually dropped due to Paredes being required for the war again. She gave birth to his second son, Sancho (b. 1518). Due to his absences from Spain, Paredes had Diego adopted by his cousin Hernando Corajo, whom Paredes appointed his heir.

After Paredes' death, Sancho erected a chapel in his honor in the Church of Santa María la Mayor in Trujillo, while Diego later arranged for flags won by Paredes in his exploits to be placed in the chapel.

== In literature ==
In Miguel de Cervantes' Don Quixote, García is mentioned multiple times. In one of them, the curate holds Diego up as an example of a real hero about whom one should read rather than about the lies in the tales of chivalry (Part I Chapter XXXII).

Lope de Vega wrote a play about him, La contienda de García de Paredes y el capitán Juan de Urbina, where Paredes and a fellow war hero, Juan de Urbina, have an encounter.

Bernal Díaz del Castillo also mentions and praises him in Historia verdadera de la conquista de la Nueva España.

== Bibliography ==
- Fernández, Alonso (1627). Historia y Anales de la ciudad y obispado de Plasencia. Juan González.
- García de Paredes, Diego (1586). Breve suma de la vida y hechos de Diego García de Paredes. Hernán Ramírez.
- Gastañaga-Ponce de León, José Luis (2012). Caballero noble desbaratado: autobiografía e invención en el siglo XVI. Purdue University Press.
- Pérez del Pulgar, Hernán (1527). Breve parte de las hazañas del excelente nombrado Gran Capitán. Jacobo Cromberger.
- Quintana, Manuel José (1852). Obras Completas del Excmo. Sr. Manuel José Quintana.
- Rodríguez Villa, Antonio (1908). Crónicas del Gran Capitán. Bailly.
- Tamayo de Vargas, Tomás (1621). Diego García de Paredes y relación breve de su tiempo al rey católico Felipe IV.
- Zurita, Jerónimo (1580). Historia del rey Don Fernando el Católico. De las empresas, y ligas de Italia.
