= 1500 in Italy =

== Events ==
- January 5 – Duke Ludovico Sforza recaptures Milan, but is soon driven out again by the French.
- April – The Battle of Novara was fought in Milan between the forces of King Louis XII of France and the forces of Ludovico Sforza, the Duke of Milan. Ultimately, Sforza was taken to France as a captive after his troops were defeated in battle.
- November 11 – Treaty of Granada: Louis XII of France and Ferdinand II of Aragon agree to divide the Kingdom of Naples between them.

== Births ==
- Giulio Campi
- Callisto Piazza
- Filipo Archinto
- Lavinia Fontana

== Deaths ==
- Serafino dell' Aquila
