= Treaty of Blois (1504) =

1504 treaty between Louis XII of France and the Holy Roman Emperor Maximillian I

The Treaty of Blois (1504), also known as the First Treaty of Blois, was an agreement between Louis XII of France and the Holy Roman Emperor, Maximillian I and his son Archduke Philip, the father of the future Emperor Charles V. It was signed on 22 September 1504 at Blois. The treaty centered on an agreement of marriage between Claude of France and Charles, with Claude carrying a dowry that included Brittany, Burgundy, and Blois, and France and Spain agreeing to bestow Naples upon Charles.

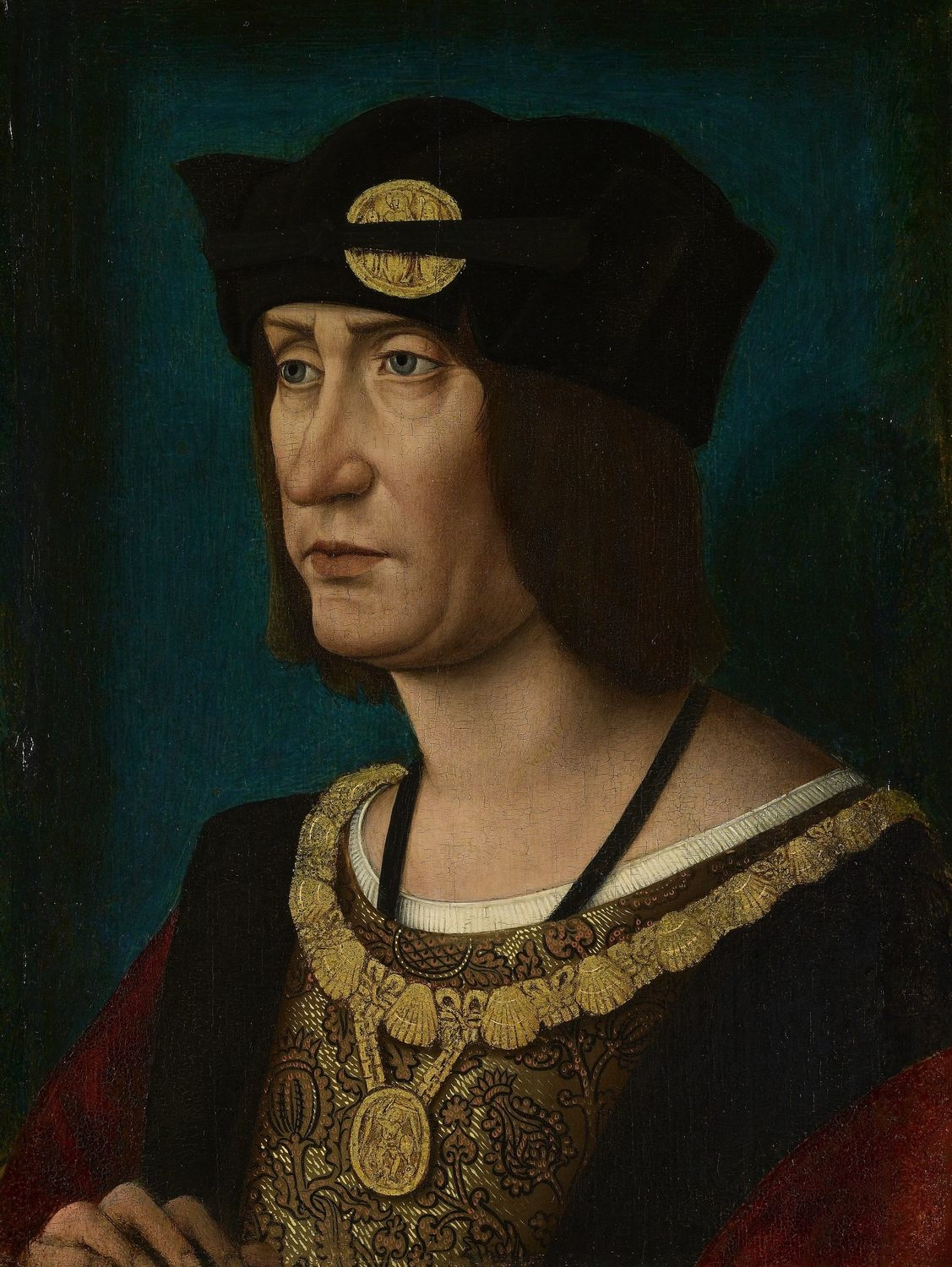
Louis XII, King of France.

However, the terms of the treaty fell through when Claude was betrothed to her second cousin, the future Francis I of France. This seemed the likely outcome from the start, as Claude's mother, Anne of Brittany, was the only participant truly eager for the match (it would have kept her Duchy of Brittany out of the control of the French crown).

== See also ==
- Italian War of 1499–1504
