= Battle of Seminara (1503) =

1503 battle of the Italian Wars

Coordinates: 38.3333°N 15.8667°E

- Part of the Third Italian War
Date	21 April 1503
Location	Near Seminara and Gioia Tauro (present-day Italy)
Result	Spanish victory

Belligerents
France	Spain

Commanders and leaders
(Kingdom of France) Bérault Stuart d'Aubigny	Fernando de Andrade

Strength
4,500 infantry 900 cavalry	4,000 infantry 800 cavalry

The Battle of Seminara of 1503 was fought on 21 April 1503 between Seminara and Gioia Tauro, Calabria, between French troops under the command of Bérault Stuart d'Aubigny and a Spanish force commanded by Fernando de Andrade during the Third Italian War.

== Background ==
In November 1500 Louis XII of France and Ferdinand II of Aragon signed the secret Treaty of Granada, in which they agreed to divide the Kingdom of Naples between themselves, despite it being ruled by Ferdinand's cousin Frederick of Naples.

In 1501 a French army under d'Aubigny attacked Naples from the north, while a Spanish force commanded by Gonzalo Fernández de Córdoba occupied the southern part of the kingdom. Frederick was deposed and his kingdom divided between the two occupying forces as stipulated in the treaty. However, dissension appeared between the Spanish and the French for possession of several areas that lay between their spheres of control, and by June 1502 war broke out between them.

The more numerous French forces were divided into two: the French Viceroy of Naples, Louis d'Armagnac, Duke of Nemours remained in Apulia besieging Fernández de Córdoba in Barletta while d'Aubigny pursued the Spanish forces under Hugo de Cardona and Manuel de Benavides in Calabria.

Coat of arms of Bérault Stuart d'Aubigny.

== The battle ==
In February 1503 a Spanish fleet sailed from Cartagena, Spain, headed for southern Italy carrying reinforcements for Fernández de Córdoba. The fleet consisted of 40 ships carrying 600 cavalry and 2,000 infantry under the command of Luis Portocarrero, and arrived in Messina, Sicily on 5 March. However, Portocarrero died shortly after his arrival, and Fernando de Andrade took over command.

Upon hearing of the Spanish reinforcements, d'Aubigny gathered 200 cavalry and 800 infantry and marched towards Terranova Sappo Minulio. He lifted the siege of Terranova and proceeded to San Martino. Meanwhile Fernando de Andrade crossed over from Messina and concentrated his troops at Seminara. After negotiations, the French and Spanish agreed to do battle on Friday, 21 April. On that day both armies met halfway between Seminara and Gioia Tauro; in the ensuing battle the Spanish defeated the French, who retreated to the north, pursued by the Spanish.

== Consequences ==
D'Aubigny and his remaining troops were besieged in Castel Angitola, and was forced to surrender one month later. He was taken to Castel Nuovo as a prisoner. The French defeat led to Calabria falling under Spanish control; one week after this battle, Fernández de Córdoba would defeat the French at Cerignola in Apulia.
