= Battle of Novara (1500) =

1500 Successful French battle of the Italian Wars

- Part of the Italian Wars and Second Italian War
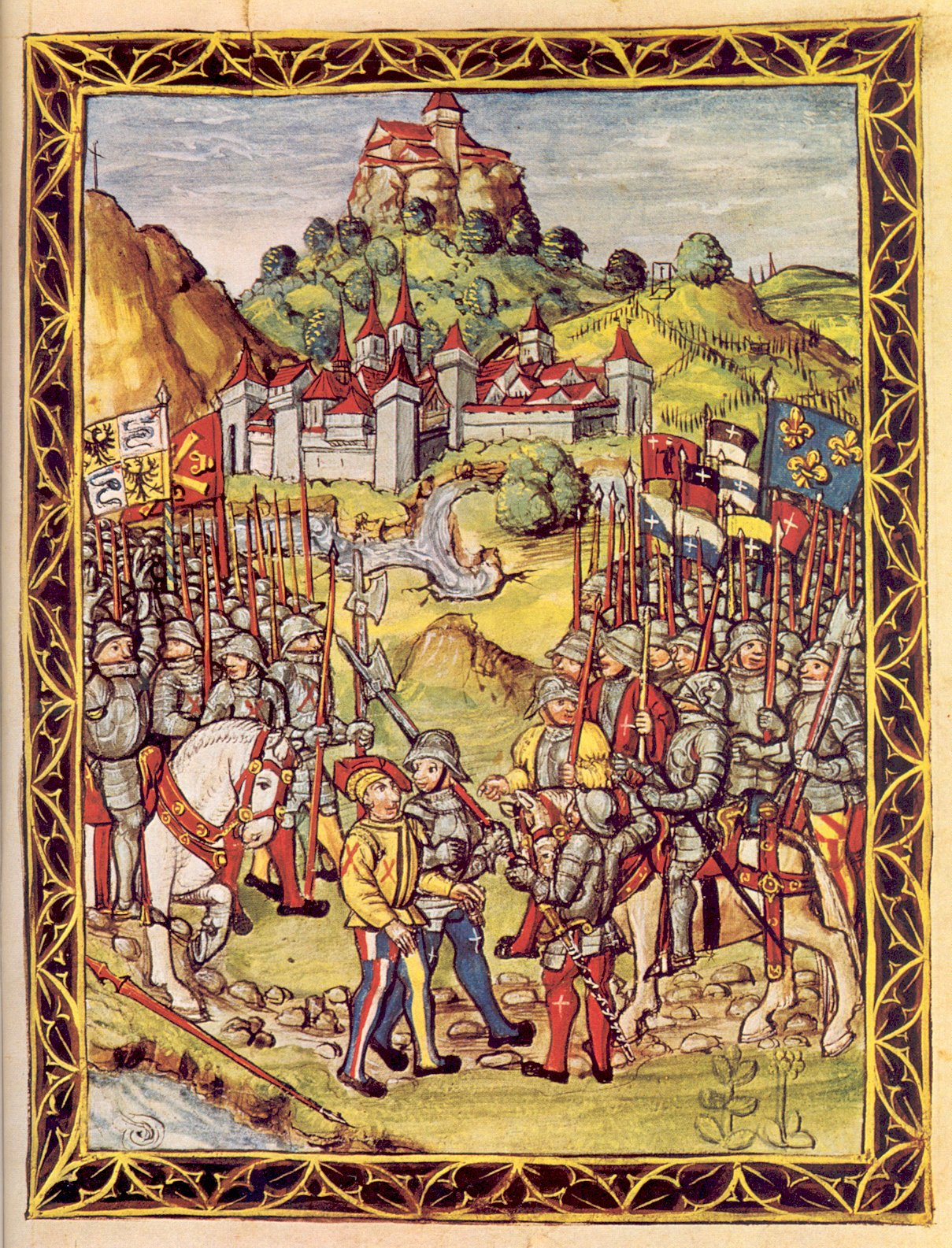
- Sforza is handed over to the French. Illustration from the Lucerne Chronicle (1513)
Date	8–10 April 1500
Location	Milan, Italy
Result	French victory

Belligerents
France	Duchy of Milan

Commanders and leaders
Louis XII of France	Ludovico Sforza

The Battle of Novara was fought on 8 April 1500 between the forces of King Louis XII of France and the forces of Ludovico Sforza, the Duke of Milan.

On 24 March 1500, Louis II de la Trémoille joined the main French army at Mortara, Lombardy, with a corps of about 500 men, supported by artillery. He was quickly followed by the 10,000 Swiss raised by the Baillie of Dijon. On 5 April, all the King's army was united and marched to engage the Milanese forces before Novara. There was a large number of Swiss mercenaries in the ranks of each of the two armies. The Helvetic cantons, in accepting their contracts, had it placed in the contracts that they would not be forced to fight against other Swiss. (The Swiss troops were close and, even though serving under different flags, would drink together.) As a result, when the action began at Novara on the 8th, Sforza's Swiss refused to act against those of La Trémoille. A cannonade caused Sforza and his army to retreat to the fortress of Novara, which was besieged by the French a few days later. La Trémoille, to cut his road to Milan, fortified himself between Novara and Tessin.

From the night of the 9th, the Swiss, in the service of Sforza, mutinied and negotiated a capitulation with the French. The German Landsknechts quickly did the same. By this capitulation, which was executed on 10 April 1500, the Swiss and Landsknechts were allowed to return to their homes with their baggage, after having laid down their arms. Their companions, the Lombards and the stratioti (Albanian and Greek light cavalry), came out of Novara and attempted to cut their way down the road to Tessin. They were charged and assaulted by the French forces. Meanwhile, the Swiss passed by pairs or threes before the French, where they were examined as the French searched for Sforza, who was thought to be concealed in their midst. He was surrendered by two of his companions, taken to France and locked up in the Château de Loches, where he was held in a cage 1.8 metres (6 ft) wide and 2.4 metres (8 ft) long. He was refused books for his amusement. In 1504, more freedom was granted to him, but he died in 1508.

== See also ==
- List of battles of the Italian Wars
