= Battle of Ruvo =

1503 Spanish-French military conflict

Coordinates: 41°7′N 16°29′E

- Part of the Third Italian War
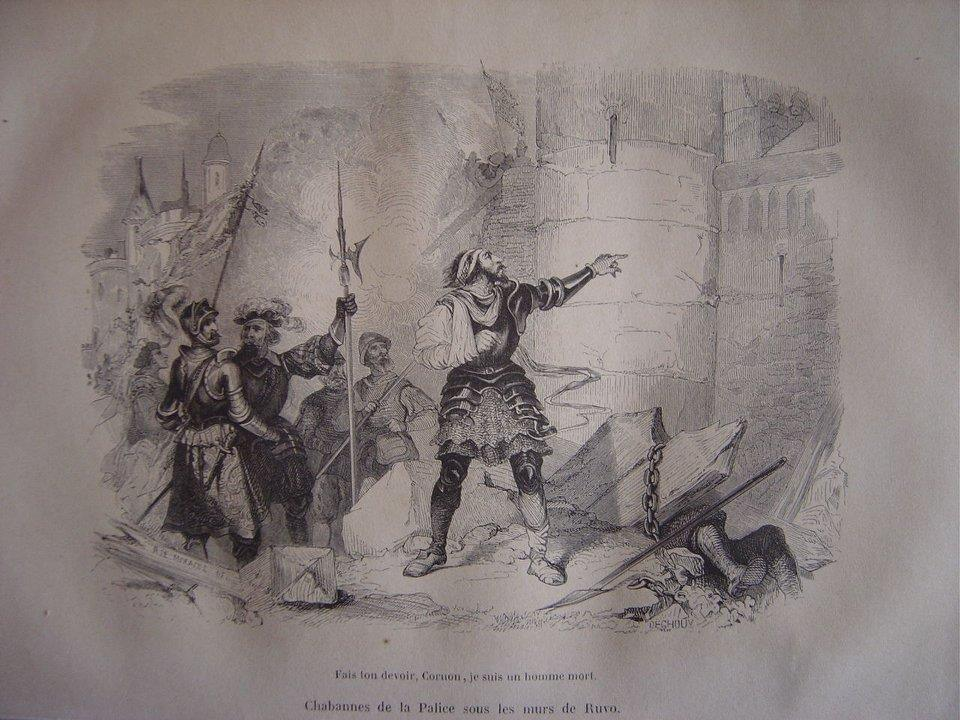
Date	23 February 1503
Location	Ruvo (present-day Italy)
Result	Spanish victory

Belligerents
Kingdom of France	Spain

Commanders and leaders
Jacques de la Palice	Gonzalo Fernández de Córdoba; Diego García de Paredes

Strength
300 lances 300 foot-soldiers	400 foot-soldiers 600 horsemen 1,300 soldiers

The Battle of Ruvo was fought on 23 February 1503 between a Spanish army under Gonzalo Fernández de Córdoba and a French army commanded by Jacques de la Palice. The battle was part of the Second Italian War and was fought at the city of Ruvo in the Province of Bari, modern-day Italy. The result was a Spanish victory.

== Background ==
Following the Treaty of Granada signed on 11 November 1500, Spanish monarch Ferdinand the Catholic and Louis XII of France agreed that each power takes a partition of the Kingdom of Naples. The deal soon fell through, however, and Spain and France resumed their war over the kingdom. This resulted in the Third Italian War.

== Battle ==
During the end of 1502 and the early part of 1503 the Spanish stood at bay in the entrenched camp at Barletta near the Ofanto river on the shores of the Adriatic Sea. Upon hearing about the retreat and departure of Louis d'Armagnac, Duke of Nemours, Gonzalo decided to launch an offensive in a Moorish guerrilla style on the city of Ruvo which was defended by Jacques de la Palice.

Gonzalo de Córdoba stormed the city at early morning launching a cannonade offensive. Soon after, he faced a resolute resistance by the French. However, within four hours he opened a breach from where the Spanish soldiers could enter and launch the assault, divided in two sections led respectively by Córdoba and Diego García de Paredes, with Pedro de Paz, Diego de Mendoza and Prospero Colonna among the participants. Fighting with swords lasted for seven hours and reached houses and streets until Jacques de la Palice was wounded and held prisoner.

The Spanish army soon decided to get back to Barletta while Louis d'Armagnac tried to return to Ruvo to help the French army. Once there he found the Spanish flag already waving in the walls of the city and understood that he arrived behind schedule and stopped to follow ahead.

== Bibliography ==
- Phillips, Charles; Alan Axelrod (2005). Encyclopedia of Wars. New York: Facts on File. ISBN 0-8160-2851-6.
