= 1494 in Italy =

== Events ==
- 5 September – The first Battle of Rapallo is fought between the Kingdom of Naples and Swiss mercenaries hired by France.
- 20 October – The Siege of Mordano takes place.

== Deaths ==
- 25 January 1494: Ferdinand I of Naples
