= Battle of Cerignola =

1503 battle in the Third Italian War

Coordinates: 41°16′N 15°54′E

- Part of the Third Italian War
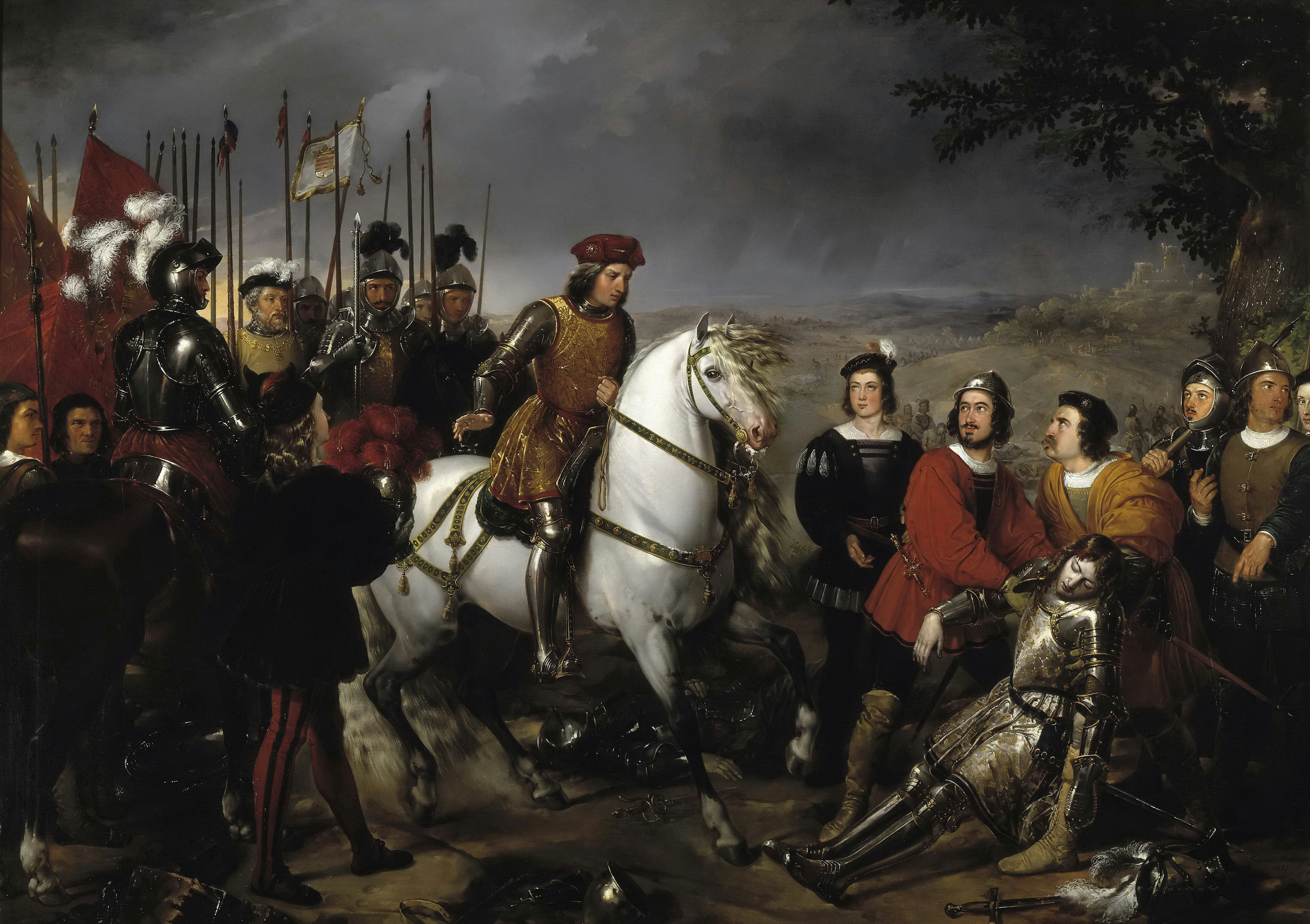
- Gonzalo Fernández de Córdoba finds the corpse of Louis d'Armagnac. Federico de Madrazo, 1835. Museo del Prado.
Date	28 April 1503
Location	Cerignola, Apulia, Kingdom of Naples (present-day Italy)
Result	Spanish victory

Belligerents
Spain	Kingdom of France

Commanders and leaders
Gonzalo Fernández de Córdoba; Prospero Colonna; Fabrizio Colonna; Pedro Navarro; Diego García de Paredes	Duke of Nemours †; Chandieu †; Yves d'Alègre; Roberto II Sanseverino; Chevalier Bayard

Strength
~9,000; 700 men-at-arms; 800 light horse; 1,000 arquebusiers; 2,000 landsknechts; 1,000+ other infantry; 20 guns	~9,000; 650 French gendarmes; 1,100 light horse; 3,500 Swiss infantry; 2,500–3,500 French infantry; 40 guns (arrived too late)

Casualties and losses
500 total casualties	2,000 killed and captured

The Battle of Cerignola was fought on 28 April 1503 between Spanish and French armies outside the town of Cerignola, Apulia, Kingdom of Naples (now in modern-day Italy), approximately 80 kilometres (50 mi) west of Bari. The Spanish force under the command of Gonzalo Fernández de Córdoba (El Gran Capitán) comprising around 9,000 men, including 2,000 Landsknecht pikemen, 1,000 arquebusiers and 20 cannons, defeated the French force of 9,000 men, mainly gendarme heavy cavalry and Swiss mercenary pikemen, with about 40 cannons, led by Louis d'Armagnac, Duke of Nemours, who was killed during the battle.

Cerignola was probably the first European battle to be won by small firearms, as the attacks by the French cavalry and Swiss pikemen were shattered by the fire of Spanish arquebusiers. It also demonstrated the renewed value of fortifications, with Córdoba employing a defensive ditch to maximize the effect of his battleplan. Military historian and British Field Marshal Bernard Montgomery described it as the turning point where infantry finally displaced cavalry on the battlefield: "Gonzalo de Córdoba had raised the infantry soldier armed with a handgun to the status of the most important fighting man on the battlefield - a status he was to retain for over 400 years".

== Background ==
The Third Italian War was re-kindled in late 1502, over disagreements stemming from the secret Treaty of Granada, signed on 11 November 1500. Although it was agreed that Louis XII of France would assume the throne of Naples, he and the monarchs of Spain soon quarreled over several territories between their respective spheres of control.

The Spanish forces under Fernández de Córdoba avoided contact with the French at first, hoping to lure the French into complacency. After a series of skirmishes, the battle of Cerignola was the first major engagement in this phase of the war, alongside the second battle of Seminara in Calabria the week before.

== Opposing forces ==
The Spanish infantry was organized into a new type of unit called coronelías, the immediate predecessor of the later tercios. They were armed with a mix of pikes, arquebuses, and swords. This type of formation had revolutionized the Spanish army, which like the French, had centered on cavalry well into the 15th century, in the battles of the Reconquista against the Muslims in Spain. For his part, Nemours commanded a professional French army based on the Ordonnance reforms, relying on the heavy armoured cavalry of the Compagnies d'ordonnance and mercenary Swiss pikemen. This army also had much more artillery than the Spanish, 26 pieces compared to Córdoba's 13, but it would not be used before the battle was decided.

== Preparations ==
Córdoba was outnumbered but had the advantage of the terrain, with the Spanish occupying and fortifying the heights of Cerignola with earthwork and stakes. In front of the hillside, a ditch was dug. Italian condottiero Prospero Colonna also advised to widen a natural drain to turn it into an additional ditch. The arquebusiers took their positions behind, with the Landsknecht pikemen behind them captained by Hans von Ravenstein. The Spanish artillery was placed on top of the hill among the vineyards, having a good view of the entire battlefield. Near the artillery, Córdoba placed German arquebusiers and ordered them to fire in alternate ranks when the battle started.

The Spanish light cavalry jinetes screened the front of the position, captained by Pedro de Paz, while the Spanish heavy cavalry under Colonna were kept in reserve. Before the battle could start, however, the Spanish artillery was left out of the battle when their gunpowder reserve exploded. Córdoba used this to encourage his men, saying "good sign friends, those are the lights of victory".

== Battle ==
The battle began with two charges by the French heavy cavalry against the centre of the Spanish army, but these were both repulsed by intense Spanish artillery and arquebus fire. The next assault tried to force the Spanish right flank, but many of the French cavalrymen fell into the Spanish ditch and the attack was again thrown back by a storm of fire from the Spanish arquebusiers. One of those killed by the arquebus volleys was Nemours, making him possibly the first European general killed in action by small-arms fire.

With the Swiss commander, Chandieu, taking charge, the Swiss pikemen attacked with the cavalry instead of waiting for the arrival of the French rearguard and artillery under Yves d'Alègre. Seeing the imminent French infantry assault upon his center, Córdoba withdrew the arquebusiers to the flanks and the Landsknecht pikemen under von Ravenstein took their place behind the ditch. The Swiss formations, joined by the Gascon infantry, were unable to break into the defensive positions. Held by the Landsknechts in the front, fired into their flanks by the arquebusiers and harassed by the Spanish light cavalry, the Swiss and French were again driven back with heavy casualties, including Chandieu.

Fernández de Córdoba then launched a counterattack by the Spanish and German infantry and the reserve of heavy Spanish cavalry. Mounted arquebusiers surrounded and routed the remaining French gendarmes, although the Swiss pikemen managed to retreat in a relatively organized fashion. Upon witnessing the defeat of both the gendarmes and the Swiss, d'Alègre directed a withdrawal. He was pursued by the victorious Spanish jinetes.

== Aftermath ==
The severe French defeat cost them around 2,000 soldiers, with Spanish losses amounting to some 500 men. The French supply wagons and artillery was captured by the victorious Spanish troops. The end of the battle saw the first time a "call to prayer" (toque de oracion) was issued, a practice that was later adopted by most Western armies, when the Great Captain, upon seeing the fields full of French bodies (who, like the Spaniards, were Christian), ordered three long tones to be played and his troops to pray for all the fallen. The body of Nemours was retrieved by Tristao da Cunha by orders of Córdoba, who hosted a military funeral for him.

After the battle the defeated French army retreated to the fortress of Gaeta north of Naples. De Córdoba's forces attempted to storm the fortress, but the attacks all failed. The besieged French were prepared for a long siege and were receiving supplies by sea. Thus unable to take Gaeta and fearing the arrival of possible French reinforcements, de Córdoba lifted the siege and retreated to Castellone, some 8 kilometers south of Gaeta.

In retrospect, Cerignola marks the rise of pike and shot tactics and the beginning of 140 years of Spanish dominance on European battlefields until the defeat of Rocroi in 1643. It is considered to be the first major battle won largely through the use of firearms, comparable to what was to occur in Japan seven decades later in the Battle of Nagashino in 1575.

== Sources ==
- Batista González, Juan (2007). España Estratégica. Guerra y Diplomacia en la Historia de España. Sílex. ISBN 978-84-7737-183-0
- Black, Jerome (1996). The Cambridge Illustrated Atlas of Warfare: Renaissance to Revolution, 1492-1792, vol 1. Cambridge University Press. ISBN 9780521470339.
- Cassidy, Ben. "Machiavelli and the Ideology of the Offensive: Gunpowder Weapons in the Art of War." Journal of Military History 67#2 (2003): 381–404. online
- Fletcher, Catherine (2020). The Beauty and the Terror: The Italian Renaissance and the Rise of the West. Oxford University Press. ISBN 9780190908492.
- Lanning, Michael Lee (2005). The Battle 100: The Stories Behind History's Most Influential Battles. Sourcebooks. ISBN 9781402224751.
- Losada, Juan Carlos (2006). Batallas Decisivas de la Historia de España. Punto de Lectura. ISBN 978-84-663-1484-8
- Mallet, Michael and Shaw, Christine. The Italian Wars 1494–1559. Harlow: Pearson Educated Limited (2012) ISBN 978-0-582-05758-6.
- Mallet, Michael and Shaw, Christine. The Italian Wars: 1494-1559. Oxon: Routledge (2019) ISBN 978-1-138-73904-8
- Montgomery, Bernard (1983). A History of Warfare: Field-Marshal Viscount Montgomery of Alamein. Morrow. ISBN 9780688016456.
- Pellegrini, Marco. Le Guerre d'Italia: 1494-1559. Bologna: Società editrice il Mulino (2017) ISBN 978-88-15-27270-6
- Tafiłowski, Piotr (2007). Wojny włoskie 1494–1559. Zabrze: Inforteditions. ISBN 978-83-89943-18-7
