= Fernando de Andrade de las Mariñas =

Fernando de Andrade de las Mariñas (1477 in Pontedeume – 1542), First Count of Andrade and Second of Vilalba, Lord of Pontedeume and Ferrol, was a Galician nobleman and important military commander during the Italian Wars. He defeated the French troops of Bérault Stuart d'Aubigny at the Battle of Seminara (1503) in the context of the Second Italian War.
