= Battle of Garigliano (1503) =

Part of the Third Italian War

Coordinates: 41.2167°N 13.5667°E

- Part of the Third Italian War
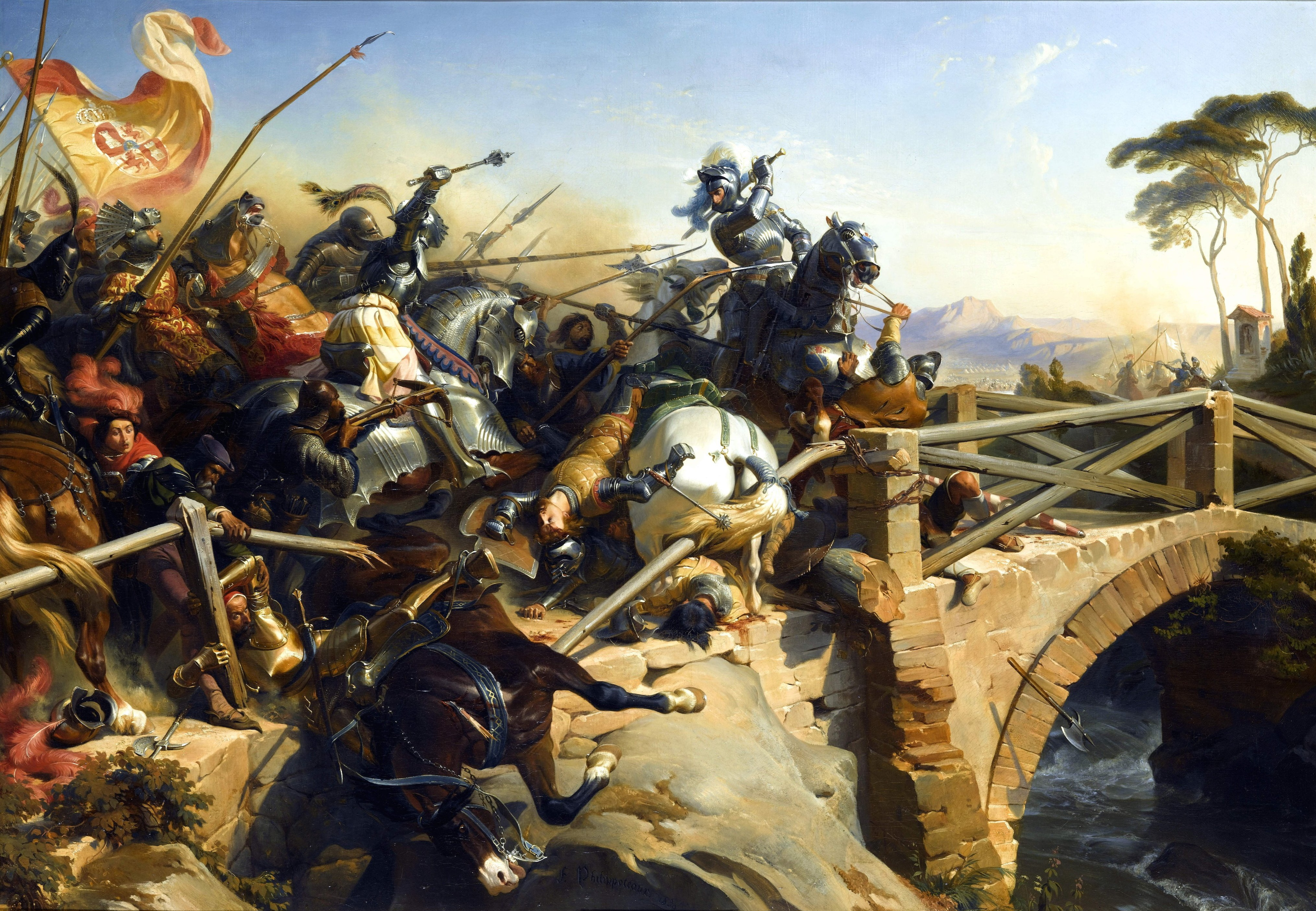
- Chevalier de Bayard at the bridge of Garigliano
Date	29 December 1503
Location	Garigliano River, near Gaeta (present-day Italy)
Result	Decisive Spanish victory

Belligerents
Kingdom of Spain	Kingdom of France; Marquisate of Saluzzo

Commanders and leaders
Gonzalo Fernández de Córdoba; Bartolomeo d'Alviano; Prospero Colonna; Pedro Navarro; Diego García de Paredes	Ludovico II of Saluzzo; Yves d'Alègre; Piero de Medici †; Francesco II Gonzaga; Pierre Terrail de Bayard

Strength
15,000	23,000

Casualties and losses
900	4,000

The Battle of Garigliano was fought on 29 December 1503 between a Spanish army under Gonzalo Fernández de Córdoba and a French army commanded by Ludovico II, Marquis of Saluzzo, resulting in a decisive Spanish victory.

== Preliminary phase ==
Map of the battle

In mid-November 1503, the French and Spanish armies were separated by the Garigliano river, some 60 km north of Naples. Both armies camped in a marshy and unhealthy area. The Spanish had tried several times to cross the river using a makeshift bridge, but always in vain. The French, based at the river's mouth near the ruins of Minturnae (Traetto), enjoyed the advantage of an accessible supply-base in the nearby port of Gaeta.

While the Spanish commander hesitated as to whether to attack or to retreat, he received reinforcements from Naples led by Bartolomeo d'Alviano and Orsini. He then decided to move some units in order to convince Ludovico that he was retreating towards the Volturno river. With Diego de Mendoza holding the rearguard with 300 men-at-arms and 5,000-6,000 infantry, Cordoba had devised a stratagem to cross the river using bridges made out of boats and barrels, which he had built in the castle of Sessa Aurunca, 23 kilometers south of the Spanish camp.

== Battle ==
During the night between 27 and 28 December, the Spanish brought the bridging materials to a place near the castle of Suio, in a position invisible to the French, some six kilometers north of the latter's camp. D'Alviano, commander of the Spanish vanguard, had the construction begin at dawn. By 10 AM some 3,500 Spaniards had crossed the Garigliano.

The 300 Norman crossbowmen in Suio did not notice the move, so Gonzalo de Cordoba was also able to cross the river with 2,000 German pikes, including 200 horsemen led by Prospero Colonna. He then ordered an attack on the French bridge. When d'Alviano's troops reached Suio, the crossbowmen fled towards Castelforte, where they met 300 French troops. These also fled to Traetto, allowing d'Alviano to occupy Castelforte. Gonzalo de Cordoba spent the night in that town.

The French had numerous ill soldiers in their Traetto camp, so they were unable to send reinforcements. French captain Alegri then decided to destroy the bridge and to order a general retreat to Gaeta, abandoning all the sick soldiers and nine cannons in the camp.

Informed about the French retreat, Gonzalo decided to continue the advance. Colonna and his horsemen made contact with the French at Scauri, but a courageous defence of a bridge by Chevalier Bayard allowed the French a safe retreat. After a series of minor clashes, the French took position near a bridge in Mola where they were able to push back Colonna's attempt to surround them. However, the arrival of the rest of the Spanish forced the Marquis of Saluzzo to order another retreat.

== Aftermath ==
The Spanish victory was decisive, as the offensive capacity of the French army was destroyed. After some days of siege in Gaeta, the French surrendered. What remained of the French army traveled either by sea or on foot back to Milan. Many died at the hands of civilians or from hunger; even the commander Ludovico, Marquis of Saluzzo, died upon reaching Genoa. With the Treaty of Blois in 1504, France recognized Spain's authority over Naples.

== Sources ==
- Day, William R.; Matzke, Michael; Saccocci, Andrea (2020). Medieval European Coinage. Vol. 12, Northern Italy. Cambridge University Press. ISBN 9781107568747.
- Keegan, John (1996). Who's Who in Military History: From 1453 to the Present Day. Routledge. ISBN 978-0415127226.
- Mallett, M.; Shaw, C. (2012). The Italian Wars, 1494–1559: War, State and Society in Early Modern Europe. New York: Routledge. ISBN 978-0582057586.
- Paoletti, Ciro (2008). A Military History of Italy. Greenwood Publishing Group. ISBN 978-0275985059.
- Tucker, Spencer C. (2010). A Global Chronology of Conflict: From the Ancient World to the Modern Middle East: From the Ancient World to the Modern Middle East. Vol. Two: 1500–1774. ABC-CLIO. p. 478. ISBN 978-1851096725.
