= Italian Wars of 1499–1504 =

Second and third phase of the Italian Wars (1499–1504)

Second and Third Italian Wars
- Part of the Italian Wars
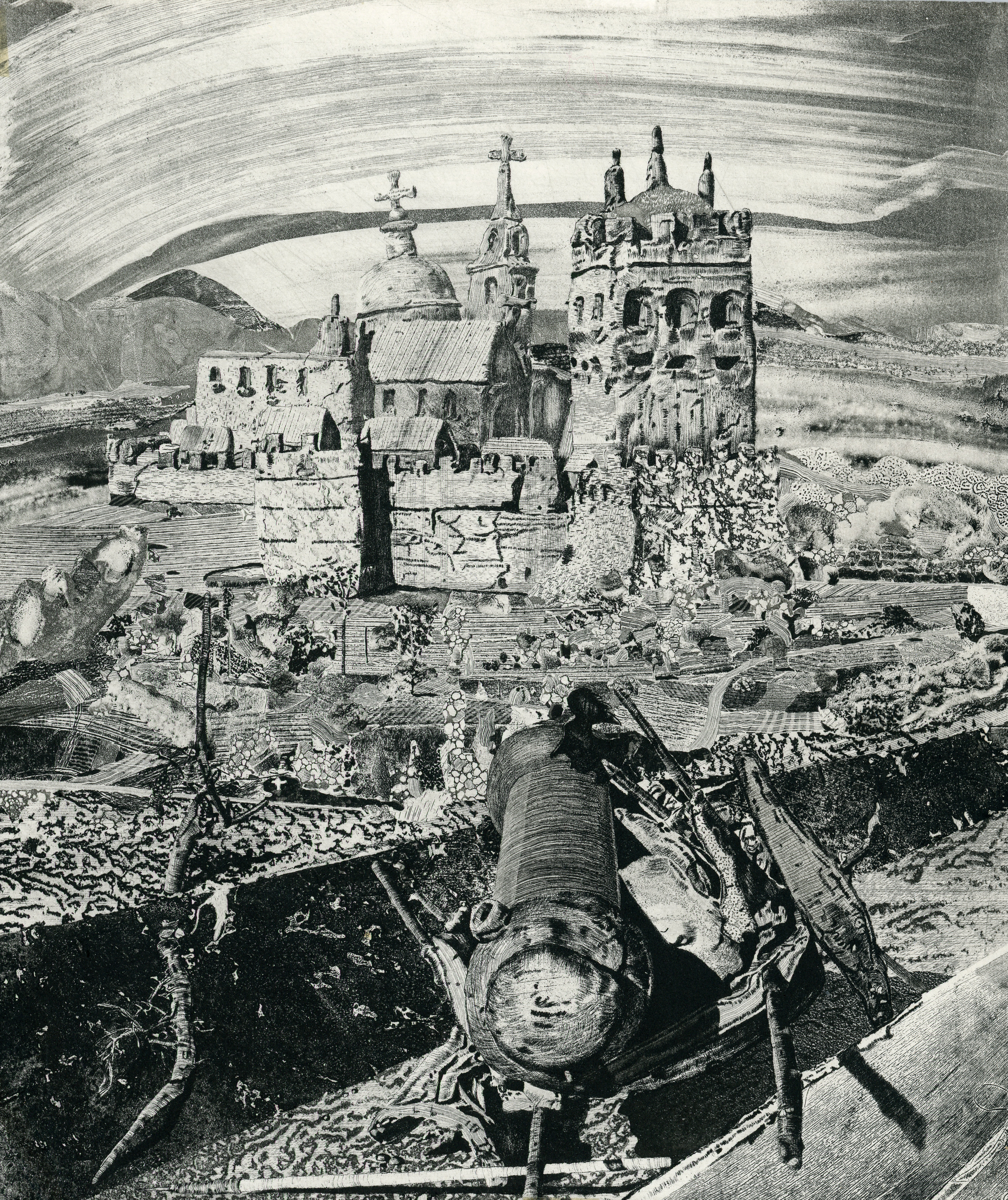
- The Battle of Cerignola, the first battle in history won by gunpowder small arms
Date	1499–1504
Location	Italy
Result	Second Italian War; French victory, conquest of the Duchy of Milan; Third Italian War; Spanish victory, Spain acquires Naples from France; Treaty of Lyon Treaty of Blois; Division of Northern and Southern Italy between France and Spain

Belligerents
Second Italian War: France; Papal States; Venice (1499); Spain (1500); Marquisate of Saluzzo	Second Italian War: Duchy of Milan; Naples
Third Italian War: War over Naples: France	Third Italian War: War over Naples: Spain

Commanders and leaders
(Kingdom of France) Louis XII of France; (Kingdom of France) Duke of Nemours †; (Kingdom of France) Bérault Stuart d'Aubigny; (Papal States) Cesare Borgia; Ludovico II of Saluzzo; Gian Giacomo Trivulzio	Ferdinand the Catholic; Gonzalo de Córdoba; Fernando de Andrade; Diego de Mendoza

Strength
1499: (Kingdom of France) 23,000–29,000	

The Italian Wars of 1499–1504 are divided into two connected, but distinct, phases: the Second Italian War (1499–1501), sometimes known as Louis XII's Italian War, and the Third Italian War (1502–1504) or War over Naples. The first phase was fought for control of the Duchy of Milan by an alliance of Louis XII of France and the Republic of Venice against Ludovico Sforza, the second between Louis and Ferdinand II of Aragon for possession of the Kingdom of Naples.

In the aftermath of the Italian War of 1494–1498, Louis was determined to pursue French claims to Milan and Naples and in October 1499 he captured Milan, which remained in French hands for the next thirteen years. His invasion of Naples in 1501 eventually led to war with Ferdinand of Aragon, who expelled the French in 1504.

== Timeline ==
This is an overview of notable events including battles during the wars.

Prelude (1498–1499)

- 7 April 1498: Charles VIII of France died and was succeeded by his cousin Louis, Duke of Orléans as Louis XII. Louis had participated in the previous war, primarily in the 1495 Siege of Novara.
- 9 February 1499: Treaty of Blois, secret alliance between France and Venice to partition the Duchy of Milan.

Second Italian War (1499–1501)

- 1 September 1499: Ludovico Sforza and his family fled Milan to Innsbruck.
- September 1499: Venetian invasion of the Duchy of Milan and anti-Sforza revolt inside the city of Milan; the rebels opened the gates to the Venetian army commanded by Gian Giacomo Trivulzio.
- 6 October 1499: The French army entered the city of Milan.
- 19 December 1499 – 12 January 1500: Siege of Forlì. Franco-Papal victory by Cesare Borgia over Caterina Sforza.
- 5 February 1500: Ludovico Sforza's Swiss mercenary army retook the city of Milan from the French.
- 21 March 1500: The Sforzescan army retook Novara from the French.
- 8–10 April 1500: Battle of Novara. French victory over Ludovico Sforza.
- 11 November 1500: Treaty of Granada, secret plan between Ferdinand II of Aragon and Louis XII of France to partition the Kingdom of Naples.
- 24 July 1501: Sack of Capua.
- 25 July 1501: Frederick of Naples abdicated the Neapolitan throne after Franco-Aragonese forces occupied Naples.

Third Italian War (1502–1504)

- 25 December 1502: Battle of Seminara (1502). French victory over Spain.
- 13 February 1503: Challenge of Barletta. Italian knights in Spanish service won a duel against French knights.
- 23 February 1503: Battle of Ruvo. Spanish victory over France.
- 21 April 1503: Battle of Seminara. Spanish victory over France.
- 28 April 1503: Battle of Cerignola. Spanish victory over France.
- 29 December 1503: Battle of Garigliano. Spanish victory over France and Saluzzo.
- 22 September 1504: Treaty of Blois (1st treaty of Blois). Louis XII of France and Maximilian I of Habsburg agree that the dowry of Louis XII's daughter, Claude, in marriage to Maximilian's grandson, the future emperor Charles V, would include Milan and Burgundy. In return, Maximilian agrees to recognize Louis XII as the duke of Milan. The union never happens.
- 12 October 1505: Treaty of Blois (2nd treaty of Blois). Louis XII of France renounces his claim to Naples, leaving the kingdom in control of Ferdinand of Aragon.

== Second Italian War ==
=== Background ===
The Italian War of 1494–1498 began when Ludovico Sforza, then Regent of Milan, invited Charles VIII of France to invade Italy, using the Angevin claim to the Kingdom of Naples as a pretext. This in turn was driven by the intense rivalry between Ludovico's wife, Beatrice d'Este, and the wife of his nephew Gian Galeazzo Sforza, Isabella of Aragon. Despite being the hereditary Duke of Milan, Gian Galeazzo had been sidelined by his uncle in 1481 and exiled to Pavia. Both women wanted to ensure their children inherited the Duchy and when Isabella's father became Alfonso II of Naples in January 1494, she asked for his help in securing their rights. In September Charles invaded the peninsula, which he justified by claiming he wanted to use Naples as a base for a crusade against the Ottoman Turks.

Although Charles conquered Naples with relative ease, after his return to France, Ferdinand II of Naples quickly regained his kingdom. He did so with support from his distant Trastamaran relative Ferdinand II of Aragon, who as ruler of the neighbouring Kingdom of Sicily viewed French expansion in southern Italy as a threat. In September 1496, Ferdinand of Naples was succeeded by his uncle Frederick.

=== War for Milan ===
Charles VIII died on 7 April 1498 and was succeeded by his second cousin Louis XII of France, who inherited the Angevin claim to Naples while also claiming the Duchy of Milan through his grandmother Valentina Visconti. His lawyers also asserted that Milan naturally belonged to the French since it had been founded by their ancestors the Gauls, as stated by Roman historian Livy.

Louis now approached the Republic of Venice, then the leading military power in Northern Italy. Venice had been financing Pisa in its fight for independence from Florence, which was supported by Milan. Doing so had proved extremely expensive while Venice was also concerned by the Ottoman threat to their maritime possessions. As a result, the Great Council was open to an alliance with France to remove Ludovico, although some members disagreed, including Agostino Barbarigo, the current Doge of Venice.

In their initial talks, the Venetians demanded lands on both sides of the Adda river, which Louis considered excessive, while Venice rejected a French request for a subsidy of 100,000 ducats. Under a deal brokered by Ercole I d'Este, Duke of Ferrara, Venice was granted Cremona along with lands on the eastern bank of the Adda, and agreed to pay part of Louis' expenses. They would also supply 1,500 cavalry and 4,000 infantry for an attack on Milan from the east and allow Louis to capture Genoa. In return, France promised to provide military support if the Ottomans attacked Venice while they were at war with Milan.

The Treaty of Blois was signed on 9 February 1499, while Pope Alexander VI approved the invasion of Milan in exchange for the French backing Cesare Borgia's campaign in Romagna. Louis hired a strong force of Swiss mercenaries and led by Gian Giacomo Trivulzio, his troops quickly over-ran the duchy. Ludovico and his children took refuge in Germany with Emperor Maximilian, while the French entered Milan on 6 October 1499. Following his victory, Louis' Franco-Visconti heraldry and name were painted over the Sforza arms at the Castello Sforzesco, while portraits of French kings replaced those of the Sforza family in the library at Pavia.

However, tensions soon emerged within the Franco-Venetian alliance over Pisa; while the Venetians preferred an independent Pisa as a way to weaken Florence, Louis needed Florentine support for his attack on Naples. With help from Emperor Maximilian, Ludovico recruited an army of 20,000 mercenaries and retook Milan on 5 February 1500; his army then moved north and captured Novara from the French on 21 March. However, his inability to pay his troops meant this success proved short-lived and on April 10 Ludovico's army was annihilated at the Battle of Novara. Despite disguising himself as a Swiss pikeman to evade imprisonment by the French, Sforza was betrayed by his own men and turned over to the French on April 15 and sent into captivity at Lys-Saint-Georges, remaining in French dungeons until his death in 1508. For the next thirteen years, French possession of Milan gave them a base form which to intervene directly in Italy. Despite defeating Ludovico, Louis XII viewed his brief but violent restoration as inspired by Pope Alexander VI and led him to deeply distrust the Holy See end up with France openly hostile and attempting to depose the next pope, Julius II.

=== Franco-Spanish efforts ===
As the summer campaign season of the year 1500 neared, Louis XII became worried about the intentions of newly unified Spain as he moved further into Italy, drawing his forces eastward. The Spanish monarchs Ferdinand and Isabella were known to be fearful of a new rapprochement between Louis XII and the Italian powers. They might invade France from the west, while Louis XII had his armies in Italy, and thus involve Louis in a war on two fronts. In the Treaty of Granada, signed by Louis and Ferdinand on 11 November 1500, the two agreed Louis would become King of Naples and gain control of Naples, Terra di Lavoro, and Abruzzi while Ferdinand was made Duke of Calabria and Apulia; the territories between were to be shared along with their revenue.

On 25 June 1500, these terms were approved by Pope Alexander VI, nominal overlord of the Kingdom of Naples. On 25 July 1501, Frederick IV of Naples abdicated in favour of Louis and died in French captivity in 1504; Francesco Guicciardini points out in the Discorso di Logrogno (1512) that the partition of the Mezzogiorno between the houses of Aragon and Orléans neglected to take into account the economic system of a region dominated by sheep-rearing and its concomitant transhumance. Within two years, differences over the allocation of the disputed areas led to war between the two powers.

== Third Italian War ==
=== War for Naples ===
When the conflict broke out again in the second half of 1502, Spanish General Gonzalo de Cordoba lacked numeric superiority, but was able to apply the lessons learned in 1495 against the Swiss infantry that France employed; moreover, the Spanish tercios, accustomed to close combat after the Reconquista, redressed some of the imbalance in arms the Spanish had with the French. Cordoba avoided encounter with the enemy at first, hoping to lure the French into complacency.

Later, the conflict became characterized by short skirmishes. During this campaign, a French knight, Charles de la Motte, was captured by Spanish forces and later used as a hostage after declaring his famous Challenge of Barletta on 13 February 1503. Chronic in-fighting between the Italian and French knights, as well as a better supply-line guaranteed by the Spanish navy, gave Cordoba and his Spanish army the upper hand against the French, who were defeated at Cerignola on 28 April 1503. At the first battle of Garigliano on November 8, a superior French force beat back the Spanish but in a second battle on 29 December, the Spanish prevailed. Attacking the French army that was still resting and relaxing after their Christmas festivities from the north at the village of Sujo, the Spanish scored a decisive and war-ending victory. The French army under Italian ally, Francesco de Gonzaga was destroyed, with about 4,000 of just over 15,000 soldiers killed at Garigliano, leaving Louis XII forced to abandon his current ambitions in Naples and, on 2 January 1504, the king withdrew to Lombardy.

=== Conclusion ===
The Treaty of Lyon was signed on 31 January 1504 between Louis XII of France and Ferdinand II of Aragon. Based on the terms of the treaty, France ceded Naples to the Hispanic monarchy. Moreover, France and Spain defined their respective control of Italian territories. France controlled northern Italy from Milan and Spain controlled Sicily and southern Italy.

The Treaty of Blois of 22 September 1504 concerned the proposed marriage between Charles of the House of Habsburg, the future Charles V, and Claude of France, daughter of King Louis XII and Anne of Brittany. If Louis XII were to die without producing a male heir, Charles of the House of Habsburg would receive as dowry the Duchy of Milan, Genoa and its dependencies, the Duchy of Brittany, the counties of Asti and Blois, the Duchy of Burgundy, the Viceroyalty of Auxonne, Auxerrois, Mâconnais and Bar-sur-Seine.

Conflict would not leave Italy for long; the next phase of the Italian Wars, the War of the League of Cambrai would erupt in 1508 over grievances between Venice and the many other regional powers.

== Sources ==
- Augustyn, Adam (2024). "Louis XII". Encyclopaedia Britannica.
- Boone, Rebecca Ard (2007). War, domination, and the Monarchy of France: Claude de Seyssel and the language of politics in the Renaissance. Brill. ISBN 978-9004162143.
- Campbell, Gordon (2005). "Blois, treaties of". The Oxford Dictionary of Renaissance. Oxford University Press. ISBN 978-0-19-860175-3 – via Oxford Reference.
- Clodfelter, Micheal (2017). Warfare and Armed Conflicts: A Statistical Encyclopedia of Casualty and Other Figures, 1492-2015. McFarland. ISBN 978-0786474707.
- Corio, Bernardino (1565). L'Historia di Milano (in Italian). Giorgio de' Cavalli.
- Gagné, John (2021). Milan Undone: Contested Sovereignties in the Italian Wars. Harvard University Press. ISBN 978-0674248724.
- Guérard, Albert (1959). France: A Modern History. University of Michigan Press. ISBN 978-0-582-05758-6.
- Konstam, Angus (2004). Historical Atlas of the Renaissance. Facts on File. ISBN 978-0816057313.
- Lynn, John A (1994). "Recalculating French Army Growth during the Grand Siecle, 1610-1715". French Historical Studies. 18 (4): 881–906. doi:10.2307/286722. JSTOR 286722.
- Mallett, Michael; Shaw, Christine (2012). The Italian Wars: 1494–1559. Pearson Education. ISBN 978-0-582-05758-6.
- Pellegrini, Marco (2009). Le guerre d'Italia. Bologna: Il Mulino.
- Phillips, Charles; Axelrod, Alan (2005). Encyclopedia of Wars. New York: Facts on File. ISBN 0-8160-2851-6.
- Romane, Julian (2020). The First and Second Italian Wars, 1494-1504. Yorkshire: Pen and Sword Books. ISBN 9781526750518.
