= Treaty of Granada (1500) =

Partition of Kingdom of Naples between France and Aragon

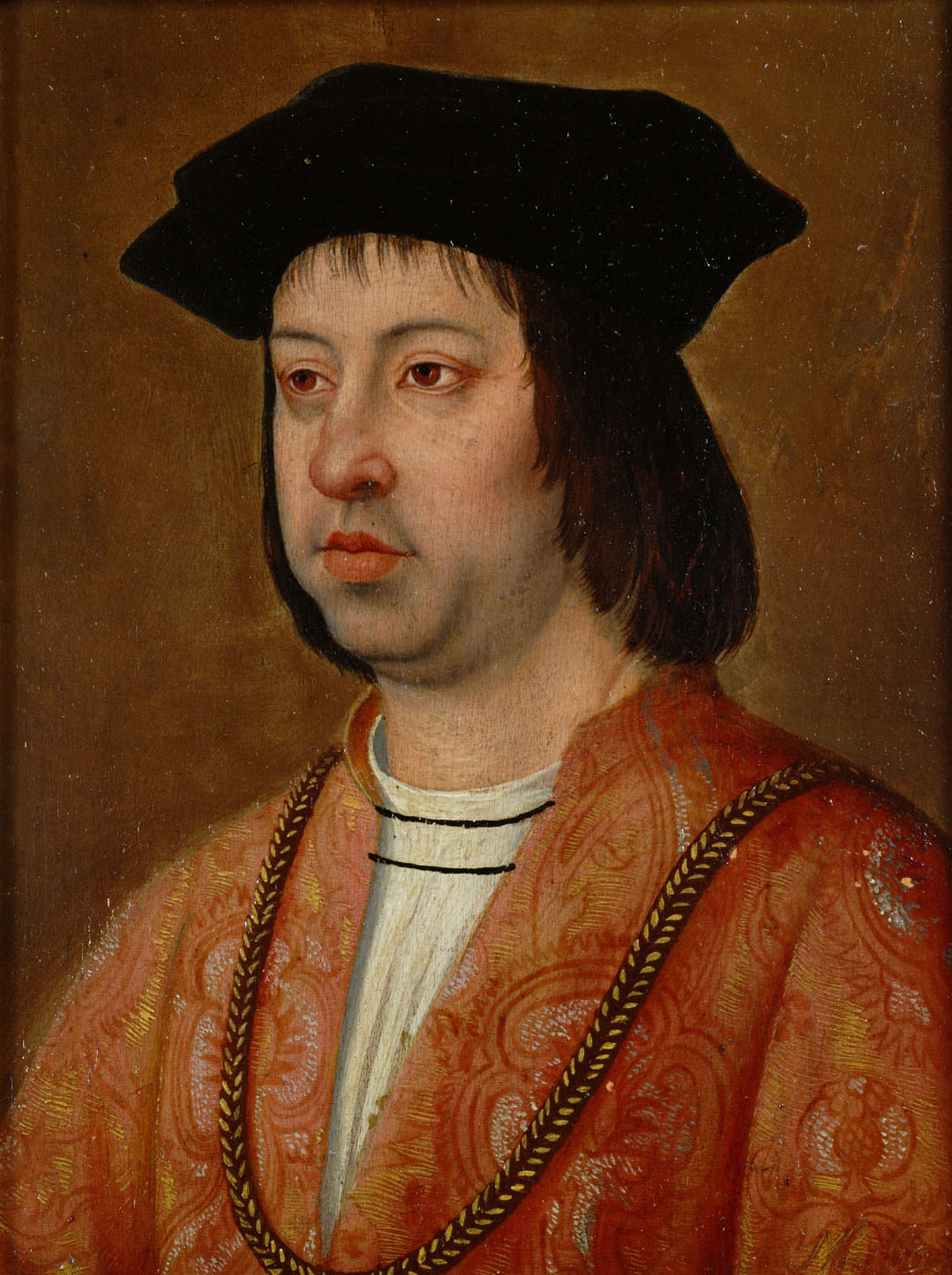
- Ferdinand II of Aragon
- Signed: 11 November 1500
- Location: Granada, Andalusia
- Original signatories: (Kingdom of France) Louis XII; Ferdinand II of Aragon
- Parties: France; Aragon
- Languages: French

The Treaty of Granada (1500), signed on 11 November 1500, was a secret treaty between Ferdinand II of Aragon and Louis XII of France, in which they agreed to partition the Kingdom of Naples. Drawn up in the context of the wider Italian Wars, the disputes between the Hispanic Kingdoms and France led to the treaty's collapse in 1503.

== Background ==
Following the death of Charles IV of Anjou in 1481, the Angevin claim to the Kingdom of Naples passed to Louis XI, then to his son Charles VIII of France in 1483. Although Charles conquered Naples with relative ease in the Italian War of 1494–1495, after his return to France, Ferdinand II of Naples quickly regained his kingdom. He did so with support from his distant relative Ferdinand II of Aragon, who as ruler of the neighbouring Kingdom of Sicily viewed French expansion in Southern Italy as a threat. In September 1496, Ferdinand of Naples was succeeded by his uncle Frederick.

Charles died in April 1498 and his claims to Naples and the Duchy of Milan were taken up by his successor, Louis XII. Aware of the hostility caused by French ambitions in Italy, in July 1498 Louis renewed the 1492 Peace of Étaples with England and signed a treaty confirming French borders with Burgundy. In August, he signed the Treaty of Marcoussis with Ferdinand of Aragon; although it did not address outstanding territorial disputes between the two countries, it agreed the two countries "have all enemies in common, except the Pope." After capturing Milan in 1499, Louis returned to France and began negotiations with Ferdinand of Aragon, offering to divide the kingdom of Naples between the two.

In doing so, Louis hoped to avoid an expensive war while also enlisting Ferdinand's help against Frederick, his relative and long-term ally. The agreement was signed by Louis at Chambord on 10 October, then by Ferdinand at Granada on 11 November. It was kept secret, although the two parties notified Pope Alexander VI, who approved the partition and recognised Louis as king of Naples.

== Provisions ==
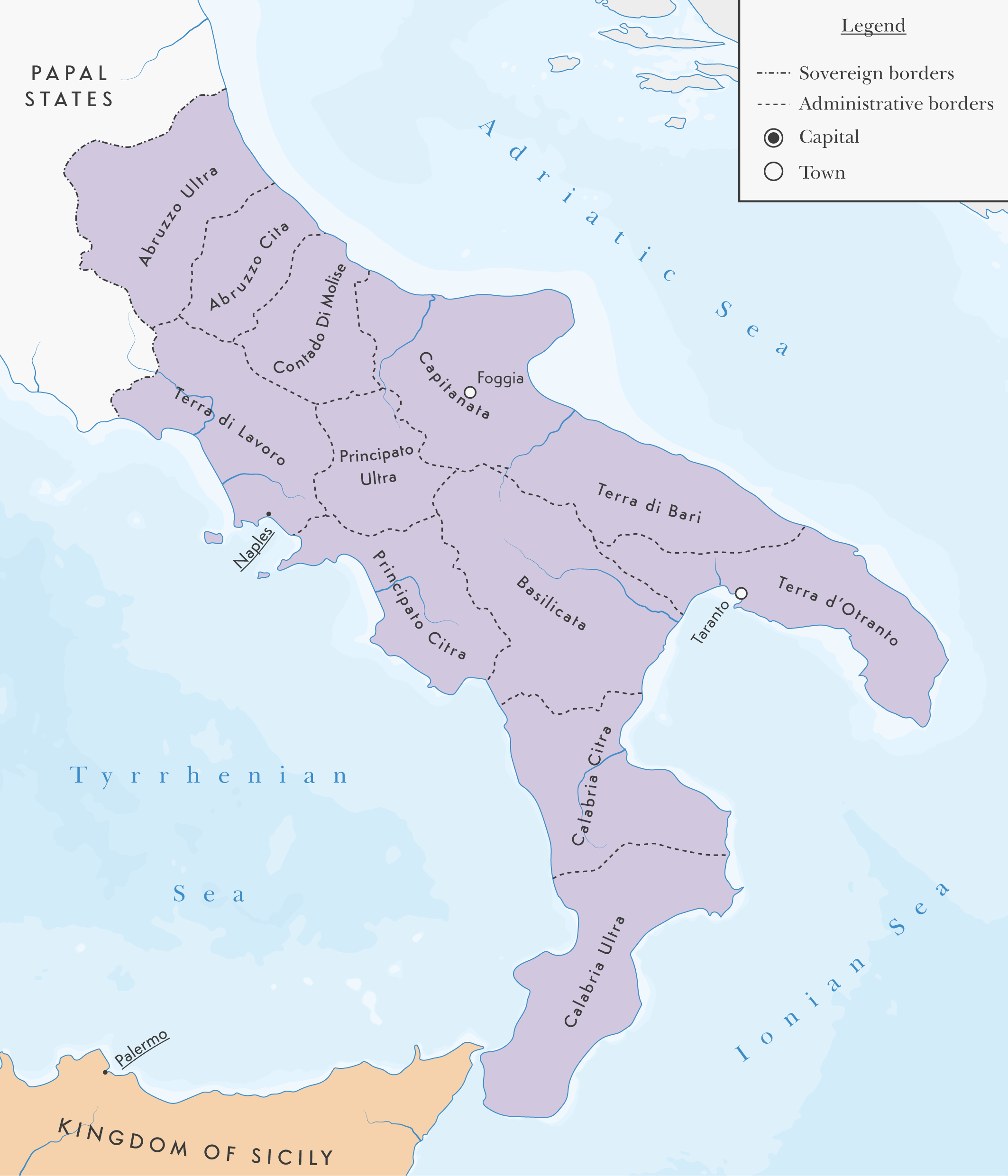
Administrative divisions of the Kingdom of Naples, 1454

Under the terms of the treaty, Louis acquired the northern regions of the kingdom, including the Abruzzo, the Terra di Lavoro, Gaeta and Naples itself. Ferdinand received the southern areas, notably Calabria, immediately adjacent to Sicily, the Terra di Bari and Terra di Otranto, both now part of Apulia (see Map).

However, three districts were left unassigned, the Basilicata, Principato and Capitanate. Based on the previous administrative structure, Ferdinand argued the first two belonged to Calabria while the third was part of Apulia, and thus fell within his sphere of control, a claim disputed by the French. The most important of the three was the Capitanate, a largely pastoral area whose taxes, or dogana delle pecore, were a primary source of revenue for the Neapolitan state.

The agreement was severely criticised by contemporaries like Niccolò Machiavelli and modern historians, who argue Ferdinand had already agreed to remain neutral in the 1499 Treaty of Marcoussis. Inviting Spain into Naples while failing to clearly demarcate the allocation of these territories could only work to Louis' detriment.

== Aftermath ==
The French and Spanish quickly over-ran the kingdom in the summer of 1501, especially as the unfortunate Frederick was initially convinced the Spanish force that landed in Calabria was there to support him. On 24 July, the French army captured Capua and Louis decided to use it as a warning of what others could expect if they resisted. Much of the town was destroyed, women subjected to mass rape and sold into slavery, while estimates of the dead ranged from 2,000 to 4,000, actions that caused consternation throughout Italy. Resistance crumbled and in August Frederick surrendered Naples to the French; he was sent into exile in France, where he died in 1504.

With the Spanish busy besieging Otranto, the French seized control of the disputed areas and refused to hand them over. Attempts to resolve the issue through negotiation failed, in part because many of the Neapolitan nobility owned lands in both parts of the kingdom and could not agree on a solution. In late 1502, minor skirmishes between the two sides led to full-scale war; by the end of 1503, the French had been expelled from Naples once again and Ferdinand took control of the whole kingdom.

== Sources ==
- Baumgartner, Frederic J (1994). Louis XII. St Martin's Press. ISBN 0-312-12072-9.
- Bowd, Stephen (2018). Renaissance Mass Murder: Civilians and Soldiers During the Italian Wars. OUP. ISBN 978-0198832614.
- Mallett, Michael; Shaw, Christine (2012). The Italian Wars: 1494–1559. Pearson Education. ISBN 978-0-582-05758-6.
- Romane, Julian (2020). The First and Second Italian Wars 1494–1504: Fearless Knights, Ruthless Princes and the Coming of Gunpowder Armies. Pen and Sword Military. ISBN 978-1526750518.
