= Battle of Casaloldo =

Coordinates: 45°15′N 10°28′E

- Part of War of the League of Cambrai
Date	10 May 1509
Location	Casaloldo, Lombardy
Result	Venetian victory

Belligerents
Marquisate of Mantua	Republic of Venice

Commanders and leaders
Alessio Beccaguto	Federico Contarini; Matteo Dal Borgo; Angelo Avogadro da Brozzo

Units involved
600 infantrymen 300–400 knights 4 cannons	370 infantrymen 200–300 cernid

Casualties and losses
60 casualties 100 injured soldiers 80 captured soldiers 50 captured horses 4 captured guns	Light

The Battle of Casaloldo was fought on 10 May 1509 at Casaloldo (Lombardy) between the armies of the Marquisate of Mantua and that of Republic of Venice, an episode of the War of the League of Cambrai.

== Background ==
During the 16th century, the expansionist ambitions of the Gonzaga family led to several clashes over the conquest of border villages of their Marquisate. Francesco II Gonzaga, Marquess of Mantua, joined the League of Cambrai on 8 December 1508, to counter the expansion of the Republic of Venice.

On 1 May 1509, when the bulk of the Venetian army was emcamped in Pontevico, the Marquess of Mantua and his army were in Canneto sull'Oglio, a town located near the border between the Marquisate of Mantua and the Republic of Venice. On that day, 200 French lancers, followed by 24 carts of fodder, wine and poultry, traversed the Po in Casalmaggiore using a pontoon bridge. After crossing the river, they went to Canneto sull'Oglio, where Francesco II distributed them into the surrounding villages. By then, the Marquess had assembled around 5,000 infantrymen, 200 knights, 200 cavalrymen and 400 crossbowmen on horseback in Canneto sull'Oglio. That army resulted difficult to maintain due to the small territory of the Marquisate and the large number of horses, which needed lots of fodder. Gonzaga paid the knights but he could not pay the infantrymen. The Venetians, warned of the movements of the Mantuans, began to fear hostile actions in the rear areas which were poorly defended, since most of their soldiers were marching towards Gera d'Adda to fight the French army.

On 3 May, a messenger sent by Louis XII, King of France, met the Marquess with orders to move his army to Casalmaggiore and then cross the Po, the Emilian countryside and go to Maccastorna, to unite his army to the French one. The Venetians knew that the Emilian cities were poorly defended, to the point that they could be easily conquered, if attacked in time. Furthermore, if the Venetians would threaten to invade the Marquisate, Francesco II would probably switch to the Serenissima's side and his army wouldn't join in the bigger French one. However, an offensive on Canneto would be very difficult, due to the presence of 30 cannons in the town. The next day, a big part of the Mantuan army started its march to Maccastorna with around 3,500 soldiers and the artillery, preceded by the Marquess, who spent the night in Colorno in the palace of Elisabetta Costanza, Galeazzo Sanseverino's wife.

== The Battle ==
Federico Contarini, Asola's Venetian governor since June 1508, as he learnt that the bulk of the Mantuan army had crossed the Po, carried out a series of raids between 8 and 9 May, devastating the enemy countryside. During the next night, Alessio Beccagutto, commander of the Marquisate's crossbowmen, having arrived from Canneto, besieged Casaloldo with around 350 knights and 600 Mantuan infantrymen, supported by two iron and two bronze cannons.
The approximately 200 Venetian infantry garrisoning the village's castle defended themselves and immediately sent a messenger to warn Contarini of the ongoing attack. Governor Contarini ordered Matteo dal Borgo and Angelo Avogadro da Brozzo to advance with around 300 countrymen, armed with spears, glaives and guisarmes, and 170 infantrymen to the besieged town. The Mantuans took up positions near Castelnuovo, where the two armies waged battle. The battle was fierce and the Mantuans did not expect the big determination of the Venetian army, which was composed mostly of peasants. During the battle, Beccagutto was unhorsed and fell in the Tartaro stream. The Mantuan soldiers, seeing that their commander and lots of their brothers in arms were injured, fled in disarray toward Canneto. Most of the infantry and dismounted knights were captured by the Venetians.

== Aftermath ==
The Venetians suffered light losses, instead the Mantuans counted 60 casualties and 80 taken prisoner, and 50 horses and 4 cannons captured. The prisoners were brought to Asola. A few days later, Beccagutto fell again in a Venetian ambush near Castiglione dello Stiviere, with as result 24 casualties and 80 taken prisoner.

Four days after the Casaloldo win, the Venetian army suffered a disastrous defeat in Agnadello at the hands of the French, and were forced to retreat from all of Lombardy and much of the Veronese area, taking refuge behind the Adige.
