= Battle of the citadel of Vicenza =

- Part of War of the League of Cambrai
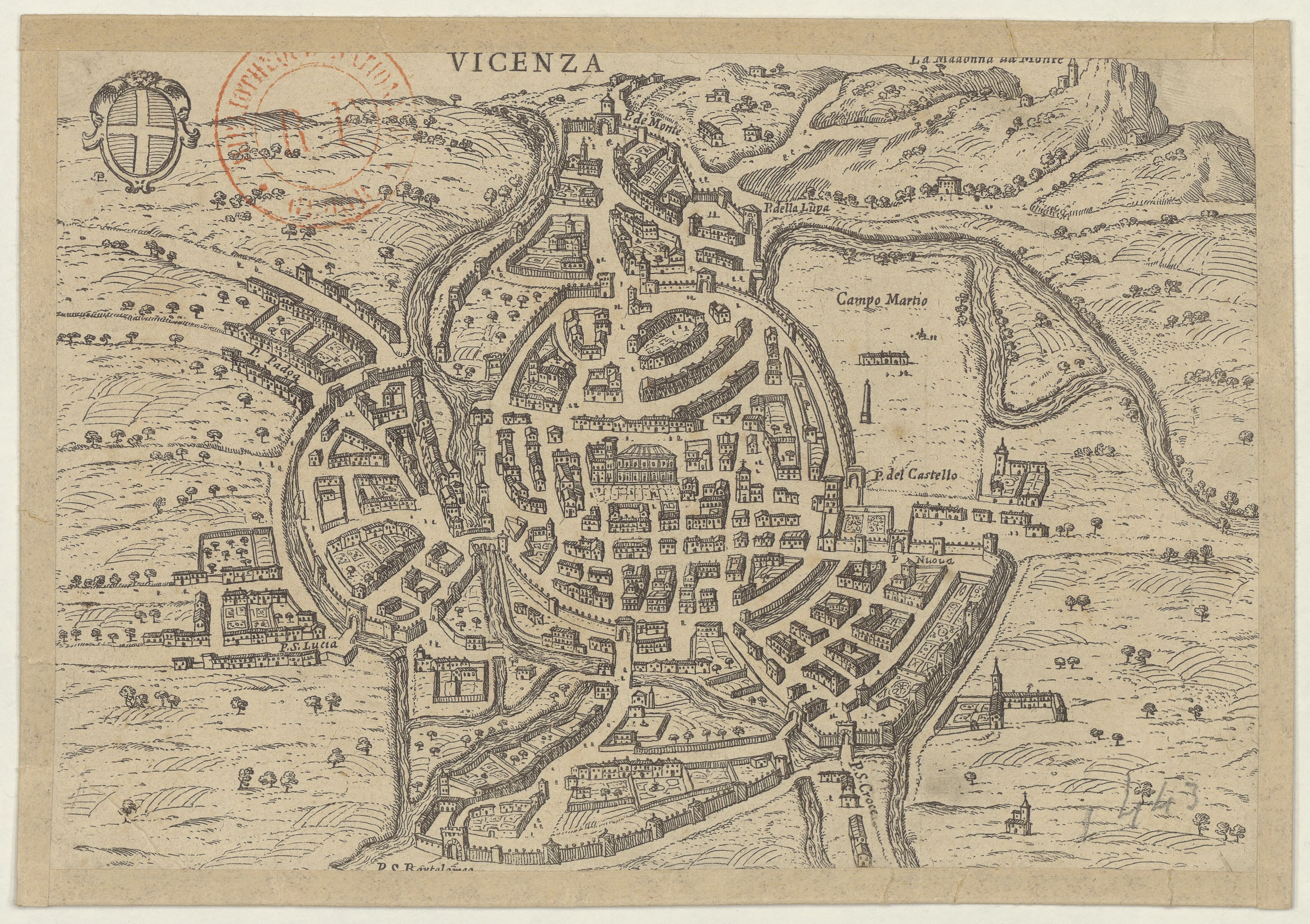
- A map of the city of Vicenza during the 16th century.
Date	26–29 November 1509
Location	Vicenza, Veneto
Result	Venetian victory

Belligerents
Holy Roman Empire	Republic of Venice

Commanders and leaders
Rudolph IV of Anhalt	Andrea Gritti

The Battle of the citadel of Vicenza was fought between November 26 and 29, 1509 in Vicenza, Italy as an episode of the War of the League of Cambrai.

== The Battle ==
In May 1509, after the crushing defeat suffered in the Battle of Agnadello, the Venetian army seemed destined to fall with the Republic of Venice. During the summer, the armies of the League of Cambrai (the Holy Roman Empire, Kingdom of France, Marquisate of Mantua, Papal States, and Duchy of Ferrara) invaded Veneto.

However, the Venetians resisted and in October, after the defeat in the Siege of Padua, the French Army's Marshal Jacques de la Palice left Veneto, retreating to Milan. The Holy Roman Emperor Maximilian I also left the battlefield, and retreated to Trento.

The Venetians were now able to take back a large part of Veneto during November and, on November 26, the inhabitants of Vicenza opened the doors of the city to Andrea Gritti and his Venetian Army. However, the imperial garrison of Vicenza remained in the city and, commanded by the Prince of Anhalt Rudolph IV, barricaded themselves in the fortified citadel. This started a three-day battle between the Venetian Army and the Army of the Holy Roman Empire, won by the Venetian Army, which took the control over the citadel.
