= Battle of Vicenza =

Battle of Vicenza may refer to:

- Battle of the citadel of Vicenza (1509), during the War of the League of Cambrai
- Battle of Vicenza, better known as the Battle of La Motta (1513), during the War of the League of Cambrai
- Battles of Vicenza (1848), during the First Italian War of Independence

== See also ==
- Bombing of Vicenza in World War II
