= War of the League of Cambrai =

Fourth & Fifth phase of the Italian Wars (1508–1516)

- Part of the Italian Wars
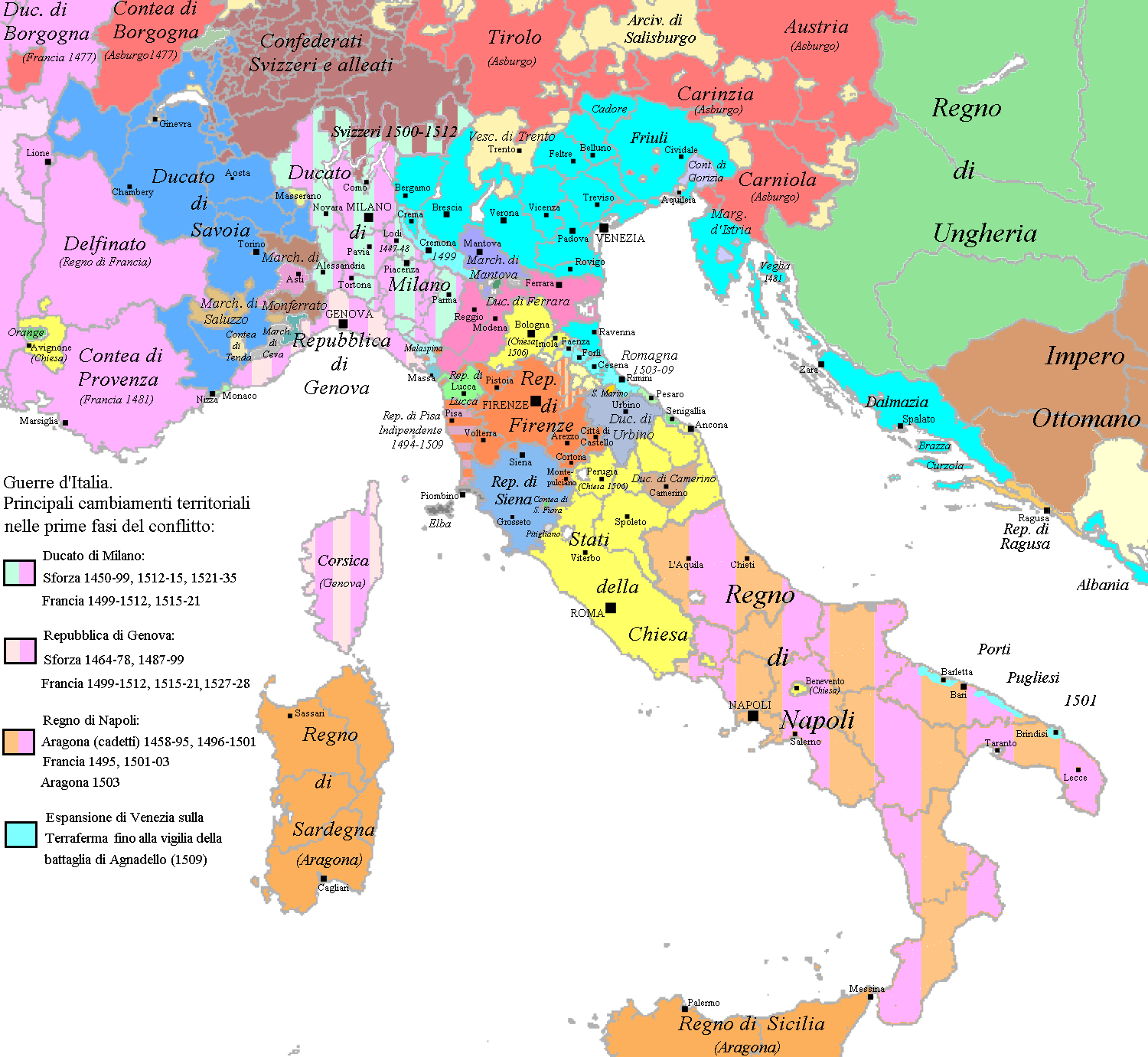
- Italy during the contemporary conflicts, that included the War of the League of Cambrai
Date	February 1508 – December 1516
Location	Italy, France, England, and Spain
Result	Franco–Venetian victory; Treaty of Noyon; Treaty of Brussels

Belligerents
1508–1510: League of Cambrai: Papal States; Kingdom of France; Holy Roman Empire; Spanish Empire; Duchy of Ferrara	1508–1510: Republic of Venice
1510–1511: France; Ferrara	1510–1511: Papal States; Republic of Venice
1511–1513: France; Ferrara; Scotland; Florence; Navarre	1511–1513: Holy League: Papal States; Republic of Venice; Spanish Empire; Holy Roman Empire; Kingdom of England; Swiss Confederacy
1513–1516: France; Republic of Venice; Ferrara	1513–1516: Papal States; Spanish Empire; Holy Roman Empire; Kingdom of England; Duchy of Milan; Swiss Confederacy

Commanders and leaders
1508–1510: (Papal States) Pope Julius II; (Kingdom of France) Louis XII; (Kingdom of France) Gian Giacomo Trivulzio; (Kingdom of France) Louis de la Trémoille; (Kingdom of France) Charles II d'Amboise; (Holy Roman Empire) Maximilian I; (Duchy of Ferrara) Alfonso I d'Este; (Duchy of Ferrara) Cardinal d'Este; (Spanish Empire) Ferdinand II	1508–1510: Leonardo Loredan; Niccolò di Pitigliano; Andrea Gritti; Bartolomeo d'Alviano (POW)
1510–1511: (Kingdom of France) Louis XII; (Kingdom of France) Charles II d'Amboise; (Duchy of Ferrara) Alfonso I d'Este	1510–1511: (Papal States) Pope Julius II
1511–1513: (Kingdom of France) Louis XII; (Kingdom of France) Gaston de Foix †; (Kingdom of France) Jacques de La Palice (POW); (Kingdom of France) Louis de la Trémoille; (Kingdom of France) André de Foix; (Duchy of Ferrara) Alfonso I d'Este; (Scotland) James IV †; (Scotland) Earl of Montrose †; (Kingdom of Navarre) John III; (Kingdom of Navarre) Pedro de Navarra	1511–1513: (Papal States) Pope Julius II; (Spanish Empire) Ferdinand II; (Spanish Empire) Ramón de Cardona; (Spanish Empire) Duke of Alba; (Spanish Empire) Pedro Navarro; (Holy Roman Empire) Maximilian I; (England) Henry VIII; (England) Catherine of Aragon; (England) Duke of Norfolk; (England) Edward Howard; (Duchy of Milan) Maximilian Sforza
1513–1516: (Kingdom of France) Francis I; (Kingdom of France) Gian Giacomo Trivulzio; (Kingdom of France) Louis de la Trémoille; (Kingdom of France) Duke of Bourbon; Bartolomeo d'Alviano	1513–1516: (Spanish Empire) Ramón de Cardona; (Spanish Empire) Fernando d'Ávalos; (Holy Roman Empire) Georg von Frundsberg; (Duchy of Milan) Maximilian Sforza; (Old Swiss Confederacy) Matthäus Schiner; (Old Swiss Confederacy) Marx Röist

The War of the League of Cambrai, also known by its second stage as the War of the Holy League, (Note: The conflict comprising the 1508–1516 portion of the Italian Wars may be divided into several stages, that are also considered by some scholars as separate wars: the War of the League of Cambrai proper (1508–1511), the War of the Holy League (1511–1514), and Francis I's First Italian War (1515–1516). Certain historians (notably Phillips and Axelrod) refer to each of those stages as separate wars, while others (notably Norwich) treat the entire conflict as a single war.) was fought from December 1508 to December 1516, (Note: Since the actual war began in April 1509, and the final truce came into effect in January 1517, some researchers (notably Wiesflecker) date the war as lasting from 1509 to 1517.) as part of the wider Italian Wars of 1494–1559. The main participants of the war, who fought for its entire duration, were France, the Holy Roman Empire, the Papal States, and the Republic of Venice; they were joined at various times by nearly every significant power in Western Europe, including Spain, England, the Duchy of Milan, the Republic of Florence, the Duchy of Ferrara, and the Swiss.

The war was preceded by the Italienzug of Maximilian I, King of the Romans, who crossed into Venetian territory in February 1508 with the imperial army on the way to be crowned Holy Roman Emperor by the pope in Rome. Meanwhile, Pope Julius II, intending to curb Venetian influence in northern Italy, brought together the League of Cambrai, an anti-Venetian alliance consisting of him, Maximilian I, Louis XII of France, and Ferdinand II of Aragon, which was formally concluded in December 1508. Although the League was initially successful, later frictions between Julius and Louis culminated in the pope abandoning the League in 1510 and allying himself with Venice against France.

The Veneto–Papal alliance eventually expanded into the Holy League in 1511, that was also joined by Spain. The League drove the French from Italy in 1512. Later disagreements about the division of the spoils, however, led Venice to abandon the coalition in favor of an alliance with France in 1513. Under the leadership of Francis I, who had succeeded Louis on the throne of France, the French and Venetians would regain the territory they had lost in a campaign culminating in the Battle of Marignano in 1515; the treaties of Noyon (August 1516) and Brussels (December 1516), which were implemented by January 1517, would essentially return the map of Italy to the status quo of 1508.

== Timeline ==
This is an overview of notable events including battles during the war.

=== Prelude (1506–1508) ===
- July 1506 – March 1507: A popular revolt in Genoa expelled the city's pro-French nobility to Savona. By late November 1506, king Louis XII of France was planning a military expedition to bring Genoa back under pro-French control.
- 28 March 1507: The Genoese revolutionary council declared war on the king of France, who had already reached Piedmont with his army.
- 22–29 April 1507: Siege of Genoa. French victory over the Genoese revolutionaries. Louis arranged a triumphal entry and forced the Genoese to swear loyalty to him.
- April 1507: The Imperial Diet of Konstanz and Maximilian I declared Louis XII of France an enemy of Christianity and a threat to Italy, and requested (and received) funding for an Italienzug. Louis XII denied seeking war with the Empire or the Papacy.
- 14 May 1507: Louis XII left Genoa and held a similar triumphal entry in Milan.
- 28 June 1507: Louis XII of France and Ferdinand II of Aragon met for six days at Savona to lay the groundwork for the League of Cambrai against Venice, most likely intending to include Maximilian and the Pope into the coalition. Ferdinand departed for Spain on 3 July.
- July 1507: The Imperial Diet promised Maximilian 12,000 troops for his Italienzug. Because this was not enough to challenge the French in Milan, as he originally intended, Maximilian later ended up deciding to attack Venice instead on the grounds of refusing to ally with him against France, and refusing him passage to Rome.

=== Maximilian's Italienzug (1508) ===
- 24 January 1508: Maximilian requested permission to march to Rome through Venetian territory, but the Venetians suspected the ruse and prepared for war.
- 4 February 1508: Maximilian I proclaimed himself Holy Roman Emperor in Trento.
- Early February 1508: Maximilian declared war on Venice. Venice requested France, then still their ally, to send aid, which Chaumont did in the form of several thousand troops from Milan.
- 20–21 February 1508: Imperial troops invaded Venice, sacking Ampezzo and besieging the Castello di Botestagno.
- 23 February 1508: Imperials captured Pieve di Cadore.
- 24 February 1508: Skirmish at Chiusa di Venas, Imperial victory over Venice.
- 27 February 1508: Imperials captured Castello di Botestagno.
- 2 March 1508: Battle of Cadore. Venetian victory over the Emperor.
- March–May 1508: Successful Venetian counter-offensives into Imperial territory. The Venetians captured Trieste on 6 May.
- Summer 1508: Venice agreed to a separate three-year truce with Maximilian without the knowledge or consent of Louis of France. Angered by this 'betrayal', Louis sought to punish the Venetians, and started contemplating a Franco-German alliance with Maximilian against Venice.

=== War of the League of Cambrai proper (1508–1511) ===
- 10 December 1508: The League of Cambrai was formally concluded.
- April 1509: France declares war on Venice.
- 27 April 1509: Pope Julius II imposes the interdict on the Venetians.
- 10 May 1509: Battle of Casaloldo: Venetian victory over Mantua (Cambrai).
- 14 May 1509: Battle of Agnadello. French (Cambrai) victory over Venice.
- 15–30 September 1509: Siege of Padua. Venetian victory over the League of Cambrai.
- 26–29 November 1509: Battle of the citadel of Vicenza. Venetian victory over the Imperials (Cambrai).
- 22 December 1509: Battle of Polesella. Ferrarese (Cambrai) victory over Venice.
- 15 February 1510: Pope Julius II concludes peace with Venice, and leaves the League of Cambrai.
- 24 February 1510: Pope Julius II revokes the interdict, imposed against the Venetians in 1509.
- May 1510: French, Ferrarese, and Imperial troops invaded Venetian territory.
- July 1510: The Pope and Venice formed an alliance and went on a counter-offensive. The League of Cambrai fell apart, leaving only France and Ferrara at war with Venice and the Pope.
- August 1510: Failed Papal attack on Ferrara.
- 17 August 1510: Papal–Venetian troops captured Modena.
- October 1510: French troops were repulsed at Bologna.
- December 1510: Papal troops captured Concordia.
- 2–19 January 1511: Siege of Mirandola (1511). Papal victory over Ferrara.
- 23 May 1511: French troops captured Bologna after an anti-Papal revolt.
- Late May 1511: French troops recaptured Mirandola.

=== War of the Holy League proper (1511–1514) ===
- 4 October 1511: Pope Julius II proclaimed the new Holy League against France, including the Papal States, Venice and Spain, later also joined by England and the Swiss Confederacy.
- 18 February 1512: Sack of Brescia. French victory over Venice.
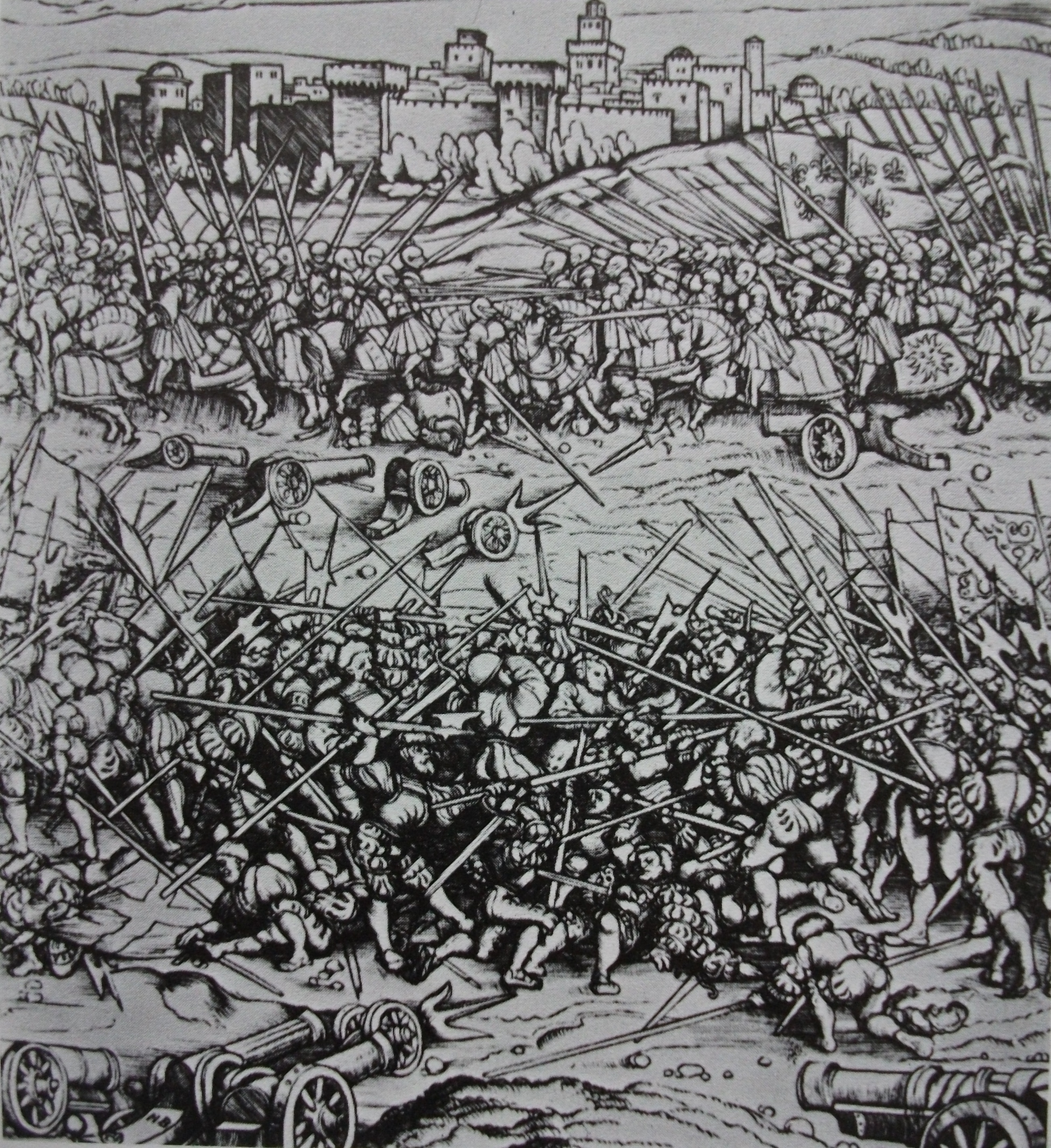
  The Battle of Ravenna in 1512
- 11 April 1512: Battle of Ravenna (1512). Franco-Ferrarese victory over the Pope.
- May 1512: Holy League troops drove French troops out of Milan.
- June 1512 – June 1515: Spanish conquest of Iberian Navarre. Spanish victory over France.
- 10 August 1512: Battle of Saint-Mathieu. English victory over France.
- August–December 1512: Holy League negotiations on territorial changes failed. Venice left the League, Milan joined the League.
- 29 December 1512: Swiss mercenaries installed Maximilian Sforza as Duke of Milan.
- 23 March 1513: Venice and France concluded an alliance to partition northern Italy between them.
- 6 June 1513: Battle of Novara (1513). Milanese–Swiss victory over France.
- 16 August 1513: Battle of the Spurs (Guinegate). Anglo-Imperial victory over France.
- 8–13 September 1513: Siege of Dijon. Swiss victory over France.
- 9 September 1513: Battle of Flodden (Flodden Field, Branxton). English victory over Scotland (allied with France). Scotland abandoned France and left the war.
- 7 October 1513: Battle of La Motta (1513). Spanish and Imperial victory over Venice (allied with France).
- November 1513: The Pope proposes peace negotiations between the emperor and the Venetians.
- March 1514: One-year truce signed between the French and the Habsburgs.
- August 1514: Peace signed between the French and the English.

=== Francis I's First Italian War (1515–1516) ===
- June 1515: The French renew their alliance with the Venetians.
- 13–14 September 1515: Battle of Marignano (Melegnano). Decisive Franco-Venetian victory over Switzerland and Milan.
- 4 October 1515: French troops captured Milan and dethroned Sforza.
- December 1515: Peace negotiations began.
- August 1516: Treaty of Noyon, concluded between kings of France and Spain.
- December 1516: Treaty of Brussels; emperor Maximilian agrees to end hostilities against Venice.
- January 1517: Truce enacted; Verona surrendered to the Venetians; peace celebrated in Venice.

== Prelude ==
In the aftermath of the First Italian War (1494–1498), Pope Alexander VI had, with French assistance, moved to consolidate Papal control over central Italy by seizing the Romagna. The illegitimate son of the Pope, Cesare Borgia, acting as Gonfalonier of the Papal armies, had expelled the Bentivoglio family from Bologna, which they had ruled as a fief, and was well on his way towards establishing a permanent Borgia state in the region when Alexander died on 18 August 1503. Although Cesare managed to seize the remnants of the Papal treasury for his own use, he was unable to secure Rome itself, as French and Spanish armies converged on the city in an attempt to influence the Papal conclave; the election of Pius III (who soon died, to be replaced by Julius II) stripped Cesare of his titles and relegated him to commanding a company of men-at-arms. Sensing Cesare's weakness, the dispossessed lords of the Romagna offered to submit to the Republic of Venice in exchange for aid in regaining their dominions; the Venetian Senate accepted and had taken possession of Rimini, Faenza, and a number of other cities by the end of 1503.

Julius II, having secured his own control of the Papal armies by arresting and imprisoning Cesare, first in Bologna and later in Ravenna, quickly moved to re-establish Papal control over the Romagna by demanding that Venice return the cities she had seized. The Republic of Venice, although willing to acknowledge Papal sovereignty over these port cities along the Adriatic coast and willing to pay Julius II an annual tribute, refused to surrender the cities themselves. In response, Julius concluded an alliance with France and the Holy Roman Empire against Venice; the death of Isabella I of Castile (26 November 1504) and the resulting collapse of relations between the parties soon dissolved the alliance (the Treaty of Blois (1504), which had ended the Italian Wars of 1499–1504, became a 'dead letter'), but not before Venice had been induced to abandon several of the cities, except for the three key towns of Rimini, Faenza and Cervia. Julius, although unsatisfied with his gains, did not himself possess sufficient forces to fight the Republic; for the next two years he instead occupied himself with the reconquest of Bologna and Perugia, which, located between Papal and Venetian territory, had in the meantime assumed a status of quasi-independence.

In 1507, Julius returned to the question of the cities in Venetian hands; once again rebuffed by the Senate, he encouraged Emperor Maximilian I to attack the Republic. Maximilian, using his journey to Rome for the Imperial coronation as a pretext, entered Venetian territory with a large army in February 1508 and advanced on Vicenza, but was defeated by a Venetian army under Bartolomeo d'Alviano (Battle of Cadore, 2 March 1508). A second assault by a Tyrolean force several weeks later was an even greater failure; Alviano not only routed the Imperial army but also seized the entire County of Gorizia, Austrian Istria (county of Pazin), as well as Trieste, Fiume, and the westernmost portions of Carniola, forcing Maximilian to conclude a truce with Venice.

== League of Cambrai ==
In the spring of 1508, the Republic provoked Julius by appointing her own candidate to the vacant bishopric of Vicenza; in response, the Pope called for all Christian nations to join him in an expedition to subdue Venice. (Note: Norwich, History of Venice, 394–395. The appointment was in keeping with prevailing custom, but Julius considered it an act of defiance against his authority.) On 10 December 1508, representatives of the Papacy, France, the Holy Roman Empire, and Ferdinand II of Aragon concluded the League of Cambrai against the Republic. The agreement provided for the complete dismemberment of Venice's territory in Italy and for its partition among the signatories: Maximilian, in addition to regaining Gorizia, Trieste, and eastern Istria, would receive Verona, Vicenza, Padua, and the Friuli; France would annex Brescia, Crema, Bergamo, and Cremona to its Milanese possessions; Ferdinand would seize Otranto; and the remainder, including Rimini and Ravenna, would be added to the Papal States.

== War of the League of Cambrai ==
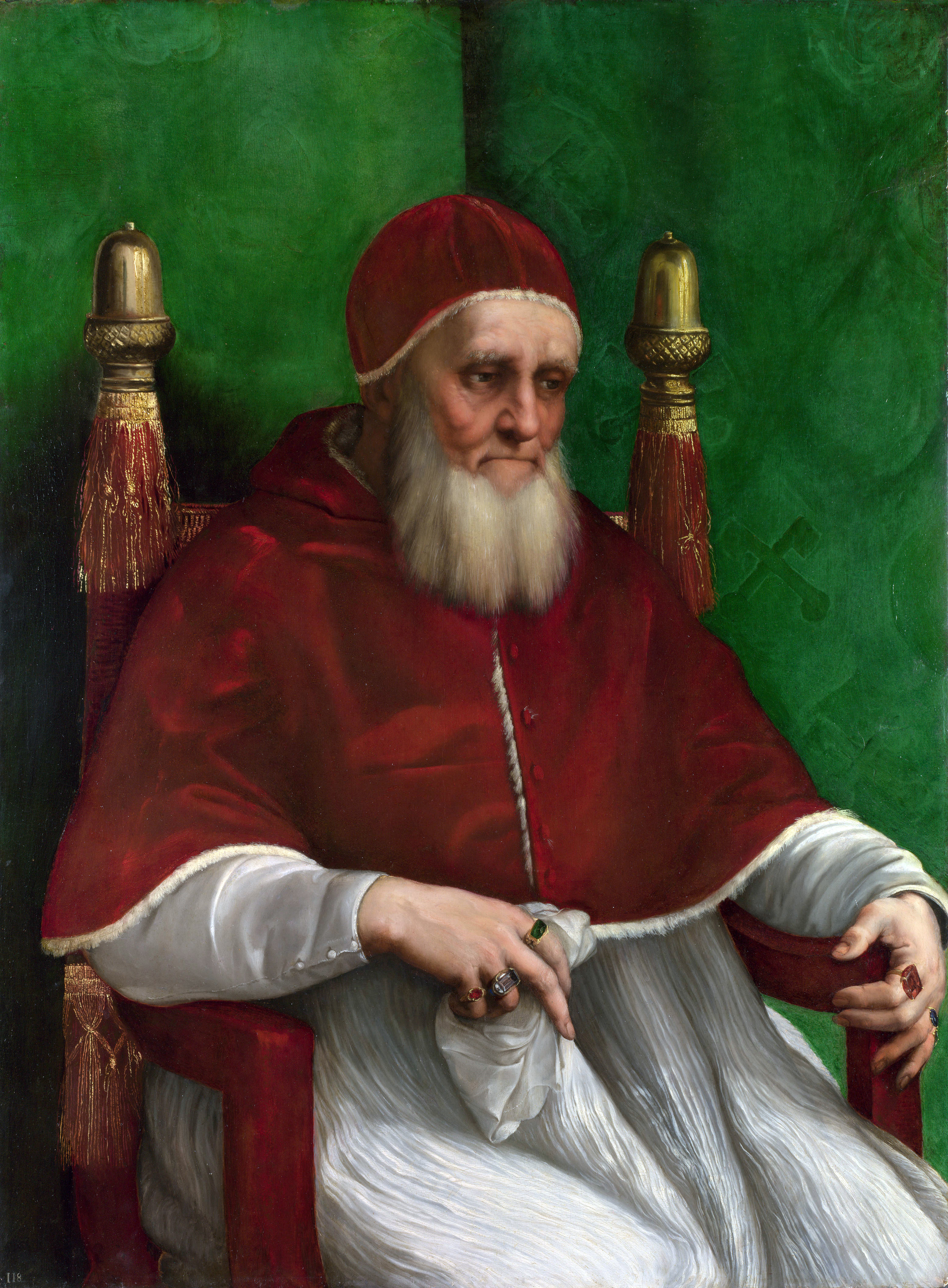
Pope Julius II, painted by Raphael (oil on wood, c. 1511). Julius attempted to secure Papal authority in Italy by creating the League of Cambrai, an alliance aimed at curbing Venetian power.

After the creation of the League of Cambrai, the danger to the Republic of Venice became imminent. Already in January 1509, the French ambassador left Venice, and by April the French king formally declared war to the Republic. On 27 April, pope Julius II issued the interdict against the Venetians.

In the same time, the Venetian Senate assembled an army of about 50,000 soldiers in Pontevico, along the Oglio river, while the main Venetian generals assembled in its Castle. On 9 May 1509, Louis crossed the Adda River at the head of a French army of about 40,000 soldiers and moved rapidly into Venetian territory. To oppose him, Venice had hired a condottiere army under the command of the Orsini cousins—Bartolomeo d'Alviano and Niccolò di Pitigliano—but had failed to account for their disagreement on how best to stop the French advance. On 14 May, Alviano confronted the French at the Battle of Agnadello; outnumbered, he sent requests for reinforcements to his cousin, who replied with orders to break off the battle and continued on his way. Alviano, disregarding the new orders, continued the engagement; his army was eventually surrounded and destroyed. Pitigliano managed to avoid encountering Louis; but his mercenary troops, hearing of Alviano's defeat, had deserted in large numbers by the next morning, forcing him to retreat to Treviso with the remnants of the Venetian army.

The Venetian collapse was complete. Louis proceeded to occupy Venetian territory as far east as Brescia without encountering any significant resistance; the Venetians lost all the territory that they had accumulated in northern Italy during the previous century. The major cities that had not been occupied by the French—Padua, Verona, and Vicenza—were left undefended by Pitigliano's withdrawal, and quickly surrendered to Maximilian when Imperial emissaries arrived in the Veneto. Julius invaded the Romagna and captured Ravenna with the assistance of Alfonso d'Este, Duke of Ferrara. D'Este, having joined the League and been appointed Gonfalonier on 19 April, seized the Polesine for himself.

The newly arrived Imperial governors, however, quickly proved to be unpopular. In mid-July, the citizens of Padua, aided by detachments of Venetian cavalry under the command of the proveditor Andrea Gritti, revolted. The landsknechts garrisoning the city were too few in number to mount effective resistance, and Padua was restored to Venetian control on 17 July. The success of the revolt finally pushed Maximilian into action. In early August, a massive Imperial army, accompanied by bodies of French and Spanish troops, set out from Trento into the Veneto. Because of a lack of horses, as well as general disorganization, Maximilian's forces were slow to begin the siege of Padua, giving Pitigliano the time to concentrate such troops as were still available to him in the city. Although French and Imperial artillery successfully breached Padua's walls, the defenders managed to hold the city until Maximilian, growing impatient, lifted the siege on 1 October and withdrew to Tyrol with the main part of his army.

In mid-November, Pitigliano returned to the offensive, recapturing Vicenza, Este, Feltre, and Belluno; an attack on Verona failed, but Pitigliano destroyed a Papal army under Francesco II of Gonzaga in the process.Angelo Trevisan organized a river attack on Ferrara by the Venetian galley fleet, but the resulting Battle of Polesella ended in another defeat for the Republic when the Venetian ships anchored in the Po River were sunk by Ferrarese artillery.

Faced with a shortage of both funds and men, the Senate decided to send an embassy to Julius in order to negotiate a settlement. The terms insisted on by the Pope were harsh: the Republic lost her traditional power to appoint clergy in her territory, as well as all jurisdiction over Papal subjects in Venice, the Romagnan cities that had prompted the war were to be returned to Julius, and reparations were to be paid to cover his expenses in capturing them. The Senate argued over the terms for two months, but finally accepted them in February 1510; even before the Venetian ambassadors had presented themselves to Julius for absolution, however, the Council of Ten had privately resolved that the terms had been accepted under duress and were therefore invalid, and that Venice should violate them at the earliest opportunity.

The peace agreement between the pope and the Venetians was concluded on 15 February 1510, and already on 24 February Julius officially revoked the interdict, that was imposed on the Venetians in 1509.

This apparent reconciliation between Venice and the Pope did not stop multiple French, Ferrarese, and Imperial armies from invading Venetian territory in May 1510. Gianpaolo Baglioni and Andrea Gritti, left in command of the Venetian forces by Pitigliano's death in January, withdrew to Padua; by 24 May, the League's armies had taken Vicenza and the Polesine, and were advancing on Legnago. Gritti fortified Padua for an expected attack by a combined Franco-Imperial army, but Louis, frustrated by Maximilian's failure to appear in person and distracted by the death of his advisor, the Cardinal d'Amboise, abandoned his plans for a siege.

== Decline of the League of Cambrai ==
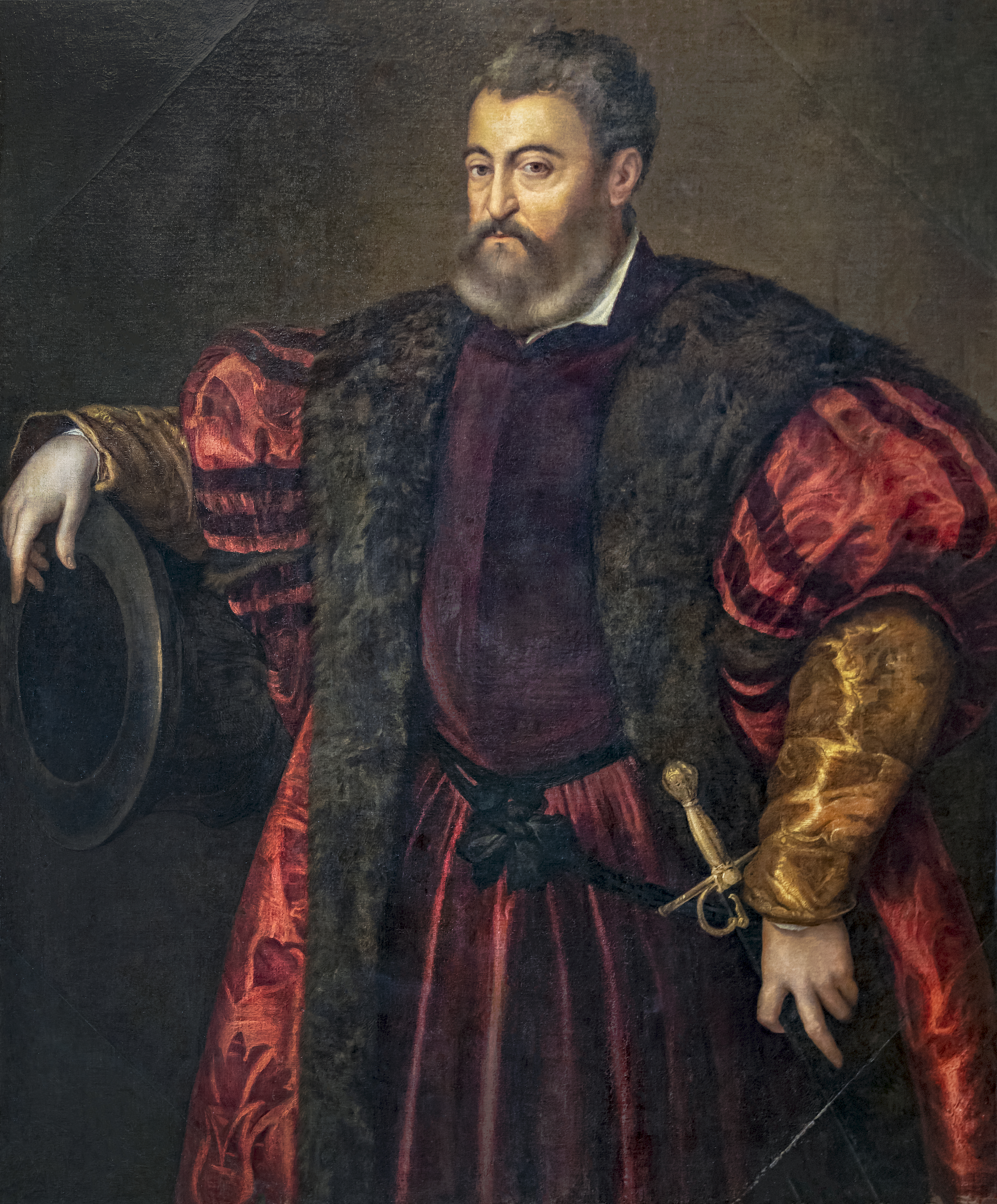
Alfonso I d'Este, Duke of Ferrara; excommunicated by Julius, he inflicted a number of defeats on the Papal forces

By concluding peace with the Venetians, the pope effectively left the League of Cambrai, but other members of the League continued to wage war against the Republic. Meanwhile, Julius had become increasingly concerned by the growing French presence in Italy; more significantly, alienated from Alfonso d'Este by friction over a licence for a salt monopoly in the Papal States and Alfonso's continued forays against Venetian forces to secure his recently reacquired Polesine, he had formulated plans to seize the Duchy of Ferrara, a French ally, and to add its territory to the Papal States. His own forces being inadequate for the venture, the Pope hired an army of Swiss mercenaries, ordering them to attack the French in Milan; he also invited Venice to ally with him against Louis. The Republic, facing a renewed French onslaught, readily accepted the offer.

Thus, the pope switched sides in the war, joining Venice against France, but without entering into direct conflict against other remaining members of the League, the Holy Roman Empire and Spain. By July 1510, the new Veneto-Papal alliance was on the offensive. An initial attack on French-occupied Genoa failed, but Venetian troops under Lucio Malvezzo finally drove the French from Vicenza in early August, and a joint force commanded by Francesco Maria della Rovere, the Duke of Urbino, captured Modena on 17 August. Julius now excommunicated Alfonso d'Este, thus justifying an attack on the Duchy of Ferrara itself; in anticipation of his coming victory, the Pope traveled to Bologna, so as to be nearby when Ferrara was taken.

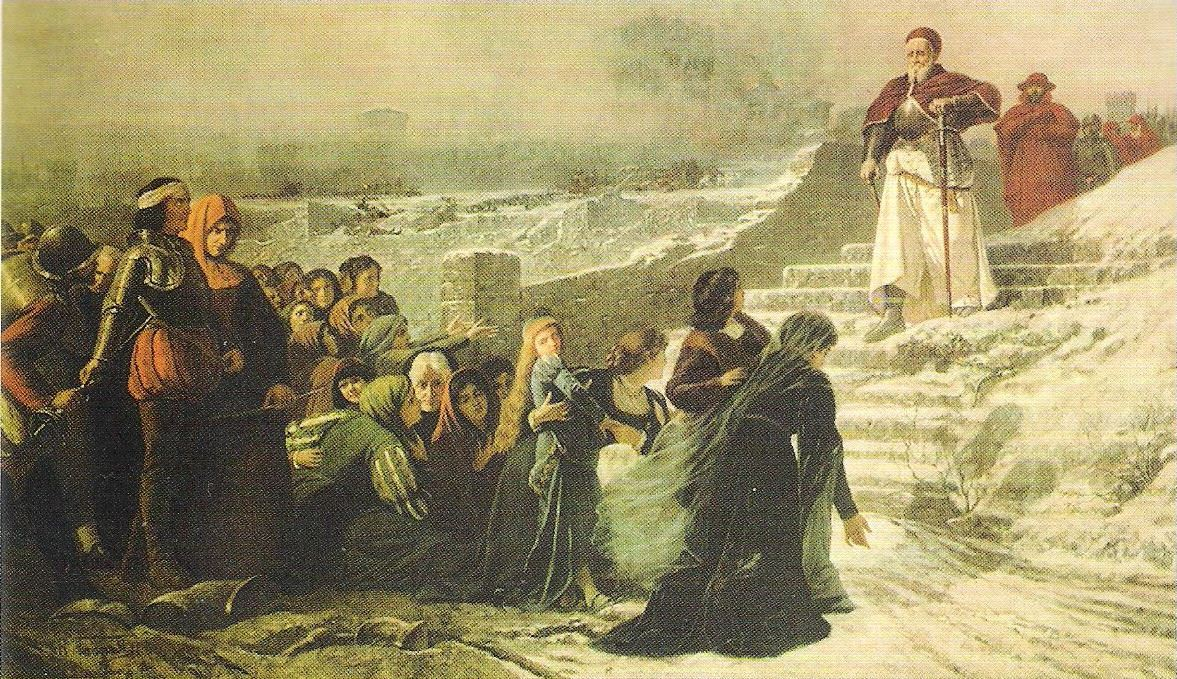
Pope Julius II on the walls of the conquered city of Mirandola (oil on canvas by Raffaello Tancredi, 1890, City Hall of Mirandola)

The French army, however, had been left unopposed by the Swiss (who, having arrived in Lombardy, had been bribed into leaving by Louis) and was free to march south into the heart of Italy. In early October, Charles II d'Amboise advanced on Bologna, splitting the Papal forces; by 18 October, he was only a few miles from the city. Julius now realized that the Bolognese were openly hostile to the Papacy and would not offer any resistance to the French; left with only a detachment of Venetian cavalry, he resorted to excommunicating d'Amboise, who had in the meantime been convinced by the English ambassador to avoid attacking the person of the Pope and had thus withdrawn to Ferrara.

In December 1510, a newly assembled Papal army conquered Concordia and besieged the fortress of Mirandola; d'Amboise, marching to relieve the latter, fell ill and died, briefly leaving the French in disarray; the pope took personal command of the siege, and Mirandola fell in January 1511. Alfonso d'Este, meanwhile, confronted and destroyed the Venetian forces on the Po River, leaving Bologna isolated once more; Julius, afraid of being trapped by the French, departed the city for Ravenna. Cardinal Francesco Alidosi, whom he left behind to command the defense of the city, was no better liked by the Bolognese than Julius himself had been; and when, in May 1511, a French army commanded by Gian Giacomo Trivulzio approached, the citizens of Bologna revolted, expelled Alidosi, and opened their gates to the French. Julius blamed this defeat on the Duke of Urbino, who, finding this quite unfair, proceeded to murder Alidosi in full view of the Papal guard.

== War of the Holy League ==
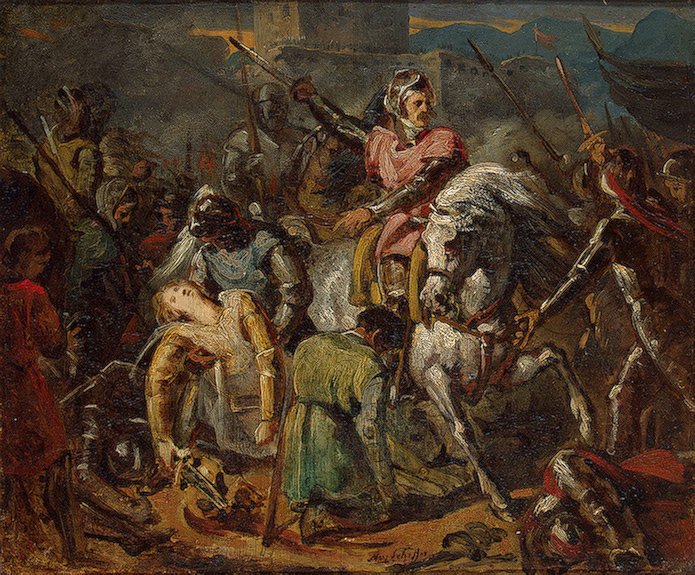
The death of Gaston de Foix during the Battle of Ravenna heralded a long period of defeats for France.

In order to break up the League of Cambrai, the pope initiated separate negotiations with emperor Maximilian and king Ferdinand. Thus in 1511, the declining alliance was additionally weakened, since Spain decided to abandon the League. Hoping to seize Navarre from queen Catherine and Lombardy from the French, king Ferdinand decided to support pope's anti-French policies. On 4 October 1511, the pope proclaimed the creation of a new alliance, known as the Holy League, that was initially consisting of the Papal States, Venice and Spain. It was designed to suppress the French ambitions in Italy.

The Holy League was also joined by Henry VIII of England who, having decided to use the occasion as an excuse to expand his holdings in northern France, concluded the anti-French Treaty of Westminster with Ferdinand on 17 November. The pope also hoped to win over emperor Maximilian, who was still reluctant to break alliance with France. The emperor avoided joining the Holy League, but he accepted the pope's mediation and on 6 April 1512 the truce was concluded in Rome between the emperor and the Venetians. Maximilian ratified the truce on 20 May, thus ending his participation in the anti-Venetian war.

Being left by his major allies, king Louis and his remaining supporters in Italy (Alfonso I d'Este, Duke of Ferrara) continued the war against Venice and its new allies. Louis appointed his nephew, Gaston de Foix, to command the French forces in Italy. Foix proved more energetic than d'Amboise and Trivulzio had been; having checked the advance of Ramón de Cardona's Spanish troops on Bologna, he returned to Lombardy to sack Brescia, which had rebelled against the French and garrisoned itself with Venetian troops. Aware that much of the French army would be diverted to deal with the impending English invasion, Foix and Alfonso d'Este besieged Ravenna, the last Papal stronghold in the Romagna, in hopes of forcing the Holy League into a decisive engagement. Cardona marched to relieve the city in early April 1512, and was decisively beaten in the resulting Battle of Ravenna, fought on Easter Sunday; the death of Foix during the fighting, however, left the French under the command of Jacques de la Palice, who, unwilling to continue the campaign without direct orders from Louis, contented himself with thoroughly sacking Ravenna, during which thousands of civilians were massacred.

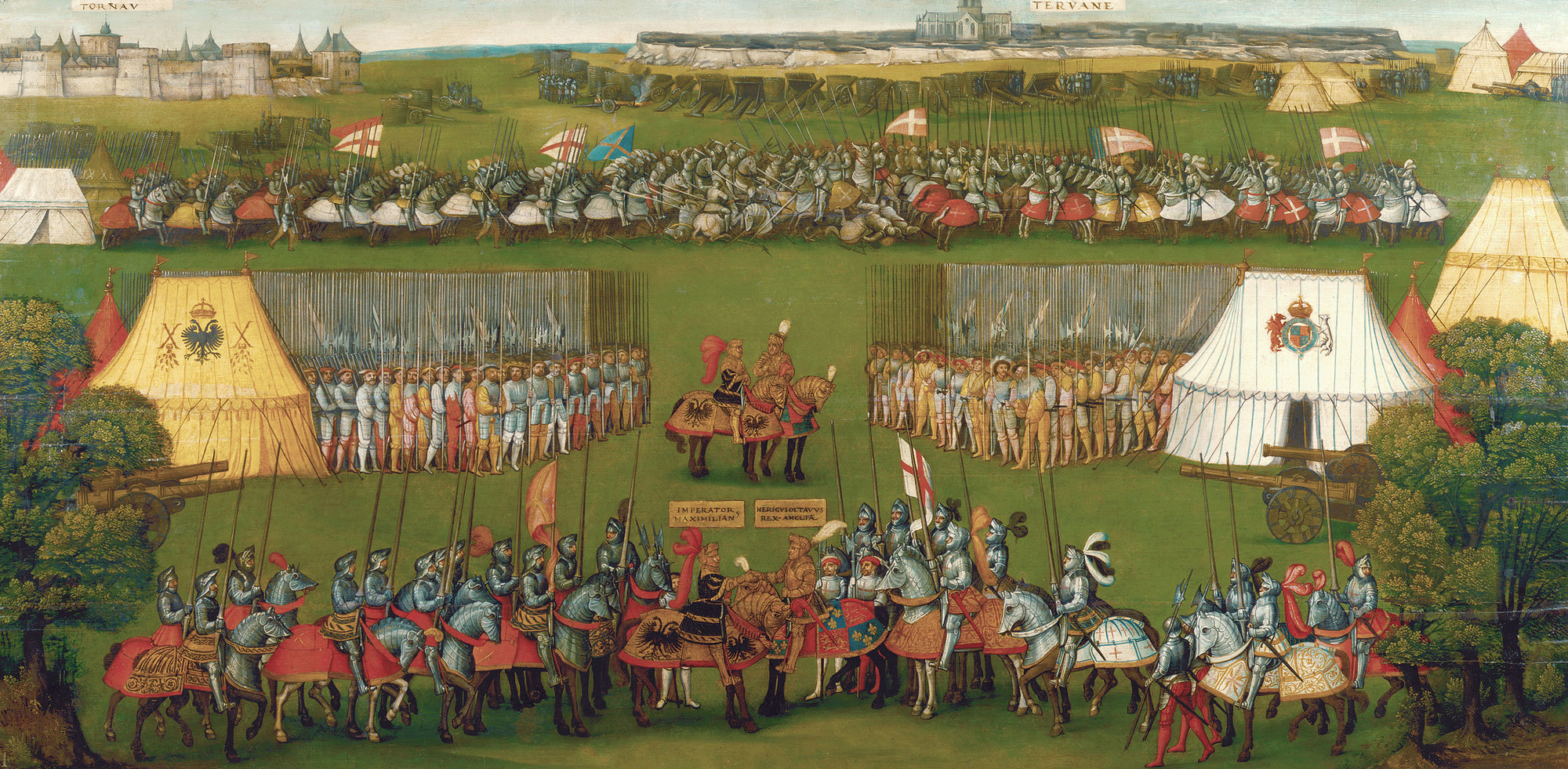
Flemish painting showing the encounter between Emperor Maximilian I and Henry VIII of England. In the background is depicted the Battle of the Spurs against Louis XII of France.

By May 1512, the French position had deteriorated considerably. Julius had hired another army of Swiss mercenaries; they descended on Milan, bringing with them Maximilian Sforza, who was determined to regain control of the Duchy for his family. The French garrisons abandoned the Romagna (where the Duke of Urbino quickly captured Bologna and Parma) and retreated to Lombardy, attempting to intercept the invasion. By August, the Swiss had combined with the Venetian army and forced Trivulzio out of Milan, allowing Sforza to be proclaimed Duke with their support; La Palice was then forced to withdraw across the Alps.

In 1512 Thomas Grey, 2nd Marquess of Dorset led an unsuccessful English military expedition to France to reconquer Aquitaine, which England had lost during the Hundred Years' War. Ferdinand of Aragon gave none of the support he had promised. While Ferdinand delayed and tried to persuade Dorset to help him to attack Navarre instead of Aquitaine, the English army's food, beer, and pay ran out, many took to wine and became ill, and the army mutinied.

In late August, the members of the Holy League met at Mantua with representatives of the emperor Maximilian to discuss the situation in Italy and the partition of territory acquired from the French. They quickly came to an agreement regarding Florence, which had angered Julius by allowing Louis to convene the Council of Pisa in its territory; at the Pope's request, Ramon de Cardona marched into Tuscany, smashed Florentine resistance, overthrew the Florentine Republic, and installed Giuliano de' Medici as ruler of the city. During this campaign, Spanish forces captured and sacked Prato. A Ferrarese ambassador reported that Spanish troops massacred the civilian population, leaving churches and houses filled with corpses. On the subject of territory, however, fundamental disagreements quickly arose. Julius and the Venetians insisted that Maximilian Sforza be permitted to keep the Duchy of Milan, while Emperor Maximilian and Ferdinand maneuvered to have one of their relatives installed as duke. The Pope demanded the annexation of Ferrara to the Papal States; Ferdinand objected to this arrangement, desiring the existence of an independent Ferrara to counter growing Papal power. The Emperor refused to relinquish any Imperial territory, which in his eyes included most of the Veneto, and signed an agreement with the Pope to exclude Venice entirely from the final partition; when the Republic objected, Julius threatened to revive the League of Cambrai against her, but died on 21 February 1513, and Cardinal Giovanni di Lorenzo de' Medici, second son of Lorenzo the Magnificent and elder brother of the new ruler of Florence, was elected Pope Leo X.

== Franco-Venetian alliance ==
The anti-French Holy League died with pope Julius II. Taking advantage, Venice turned to Louis; on 23 March 1513, a treaty pledging to divide all of northern Italy between France and the Republic was signed at Blois. In late May 1513, a French army commanded by Louis de la Trémoille crossed the Alps and advanced on Milan; at the same time, Bartolomeo d'Alviano and the Venetian army marched west from Padua. The unpopularity of Maximilian Sforza, who was seen by the Milanese as a puppet of his Swiss mercenaries, enabled the French to move through Lombardy with little resistance; Trémoille, having seized Milan, besieged the remaining Swiss in Novara. On 6 June, the French were attacked by a Swiss relief army at the Battle of Novara, and were routed despite having superior numbers. Detachments of the Swiss army pursued the fleeing French over the Alps and had reached Dijon before being bribed into withdrawing.

The rout at Novara inaugurated a period of defeats for the French alliance. English troops under Henry VIII besieged Thérouanne, defeated La Palice at the Battle of the Spurs, and captured Tournai. In Navarre, resistance to Ferdinand's invasion collapsed; he rapidly consolidated his hold over the entire region and moved to support another English offensive in the Guyenne. James IV of Scotland invaded England at the behest of Louis; but he failed to draw Henry's attention from France, and his death—and the Scots' catastrophic defeat—at the Battle of Flodden on 9 September 1513, ended Scotland's brief involvement in the war.

Meanwhile, Alviano, unexpectedly left without French support, retreated into the Veneto, pursued closely by the Spanish army under Cardona; while the Spanish were unable to capture Padua in the face of determined Venetian resistance, they penetrated deep into Venetian territory and by late September were in sight of Venice itself. Cardona attempted a bombardment of the city that proved largely ineffective; then, having no boats with which to cross the Venetian Lagoon, turned back for Lombardy. Alviano, having been reinforced by hundreds of volunteers from the Venetian nobility, pursued Cardona and confronted him outside Vicenza on 7 October; in the resulting Battle of La Motta, the Venetian army was decisively defeated, with many prominent noblemen cut down outside the city walls as they attempted to flee. In November, the Pope proposed peace negotiations between the Venetians and the emperor, and in December appealed again to the emperor and all of imperial electors to end hostilities against the Venetians and the French, but Cardona and Alviano continued to skirmish in the Friuli for the remainder of 1513 and through 1514.

On 13 March 1514 at Orléans, a one-year truce was concluded between the French king on the one side, and emperor Maximilian and king Ferdinand of Aragon on the other. On 7 August of the same year, another peace agreement was reached, between the French and the English.

The death of Louis XII on 1 January 1515 brought Francis I to the throne; having assumed the title of Duke of Milan at his coronation, Francis immediately moved to reclaim his holdings in Italy. On 27 June, the new French king renewed the alliance with the Venetians. By July, Francis had assembled an army in the Dauphiné; a combined Swiss and Papal force moved north from Milan to block the Alpine passes against him, but Francis, following the advice of Gian Giacomo Trivulzio, avoided the main passes and marched instead through the valley of the Stura. The French vanguard surprised the Milanese cavalry at Villafranca, capturing Prospero Colonna; meanwhile, Francis and the main body of the French confronted the Swiss at the Battle of Marignano on 13 September. The Swiss advance initially made headway; however, Francis's superiority in cavalry and artillery, together with the timely arrival of Alviano (who had successfully avoided Cardona's army at Verona) on the morning of 14 September, led to a decisive victory for Francis and the Venetians.

After the victory at Marignano, Francis advanced on Milan, capturing the city on 4 October and removing Sforza from the throne. In December, he met with Leo at Bologna; the pope, who had in the meantime been deserted by the remainder of his Swiss mercenaries, surrendered Parma and Piacenza to Francis and Modena to the Duke of Ferrara. In return, Leo received guarantees of French noninterference in his proposed attack on the Duchy of Urbino.

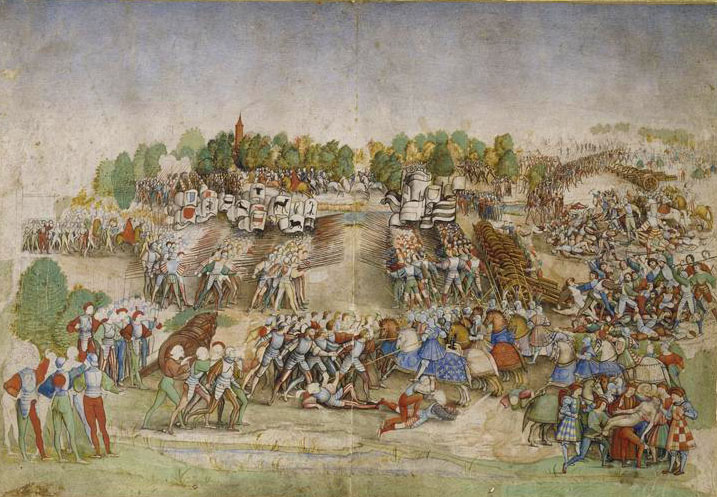
In 1515, the Franco-Venetian alliance decisively defeated the Holy League at the Battle of Marignano.

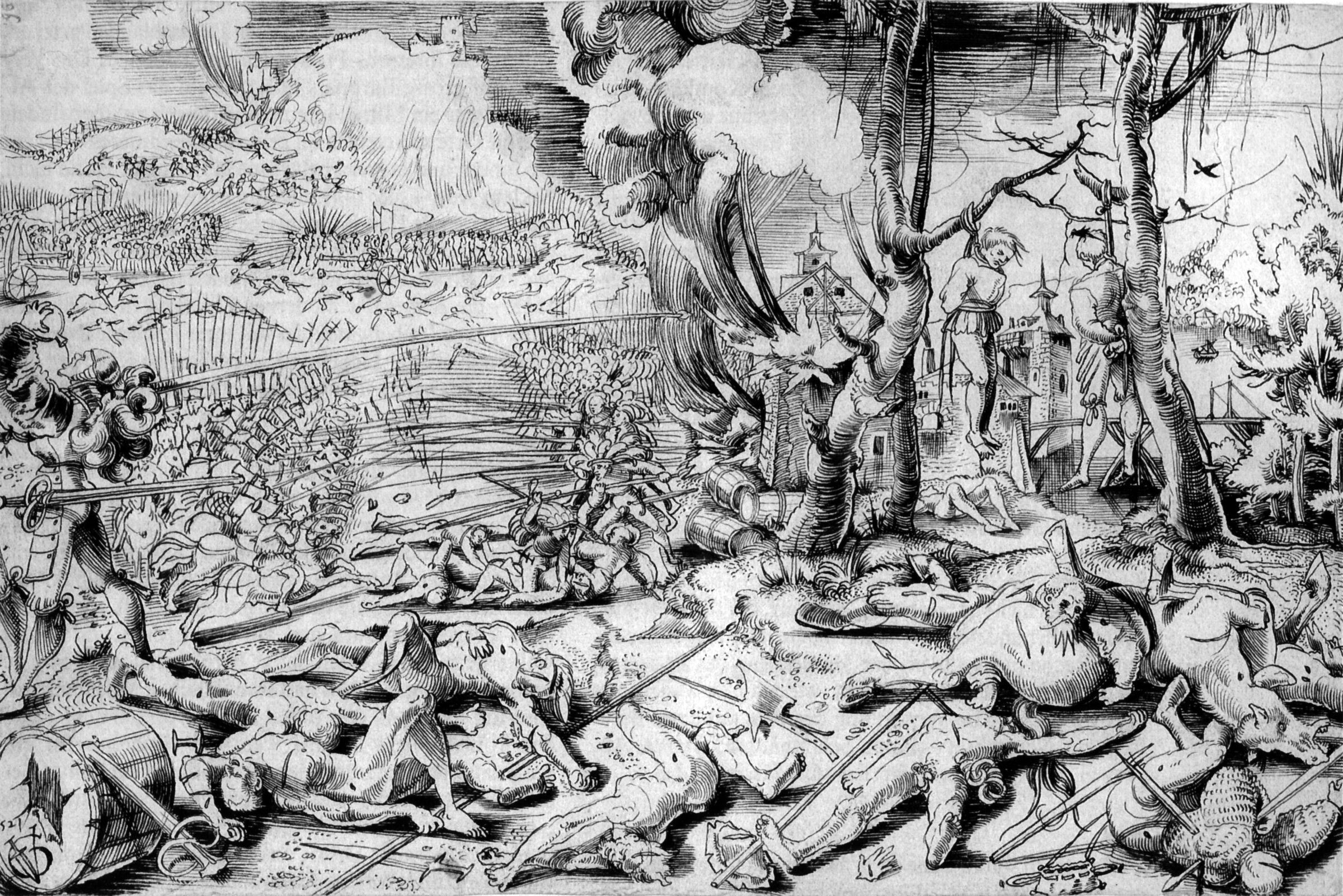
After the Battle of Marignano, drawing by Urs Graf, 1521

== Aftermath ==
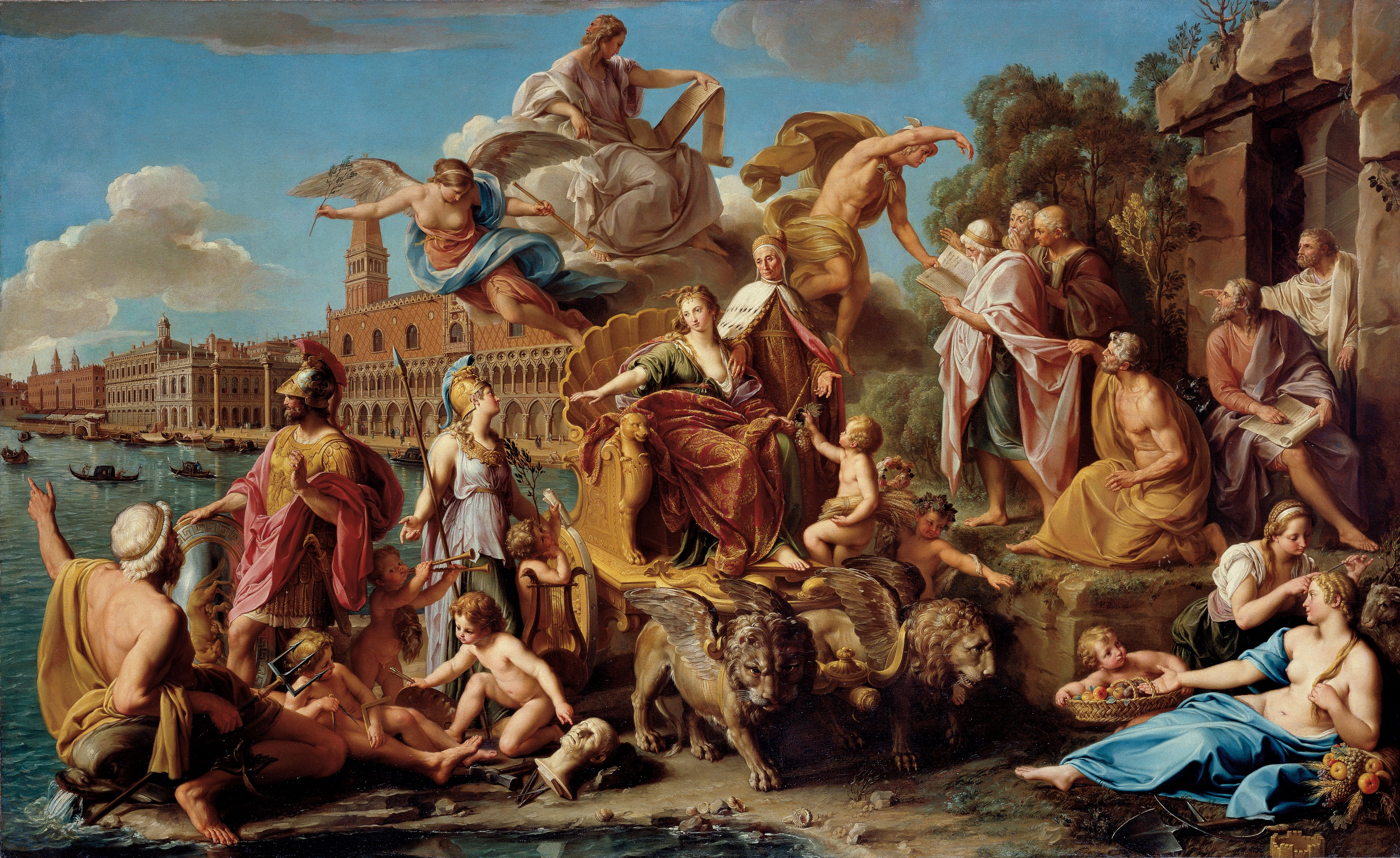
The Triumph of Venice (oil on canvas by Pompeo Batoni, 1737) depicts Leonardo Loredan, Doge of Venice during the war.

In January 1516, king Ferdinand II of Aragon died and was succeeded by his grandson, the future emperor Charles V, who became sovereign of all Spanish and southern Italian realms. Interested in securing his rule over the Kingdom of Naples, Charles entered into negotiations with the French king. Charles was ready to recognize French claims to Milan, while Francis decided to recognize Spanish claims to Naples. On those bases, the Treaty of Noyon was concluded between Charles and Francis in August 1516, thus removing Spain from the war.

Maximilian held out, making another attempt to invade Lombardy; his army failed to reach Milan before turning back, and by the autumn of 1516, he had entered into negotiations with Francis. The resulting Treaty of Brussels, concluded on 6 December 1516, not only accepted French occupation of Milan, but also confirmed Venetian claims to the remainder of the Imperial possessions in Lombardy (except for Cremona), effectively ending the war with a return to the status quo of 1508. By the same treaty, emperor Maximilian agreed to end all hostilities by accepting the truce with Venice, and already by January 1517 key provisions of the treaty were put in effect. All military operations were ceased, and Verona was surrendered to the Venetians. In Venice, the end of war was marked by various celebrations, that took place from January to March 1517.

The peace, however, would last only four years; the growing rivalry between the House of Valois and the House of Habsburg, and the election of Charles V as Holy Roman Emperor in 1519, would soon lead to the Italian War of 1521–26.

== See also ==
- Early Modern France
- Early Modern Germany
- Early Modern Italy
- Italian Wars
- League of Cambrai
- Treaty of Fribourg (1516)
