= Siege of Padua =

Military action in 1509

- Part of the War of the League of Cambrai
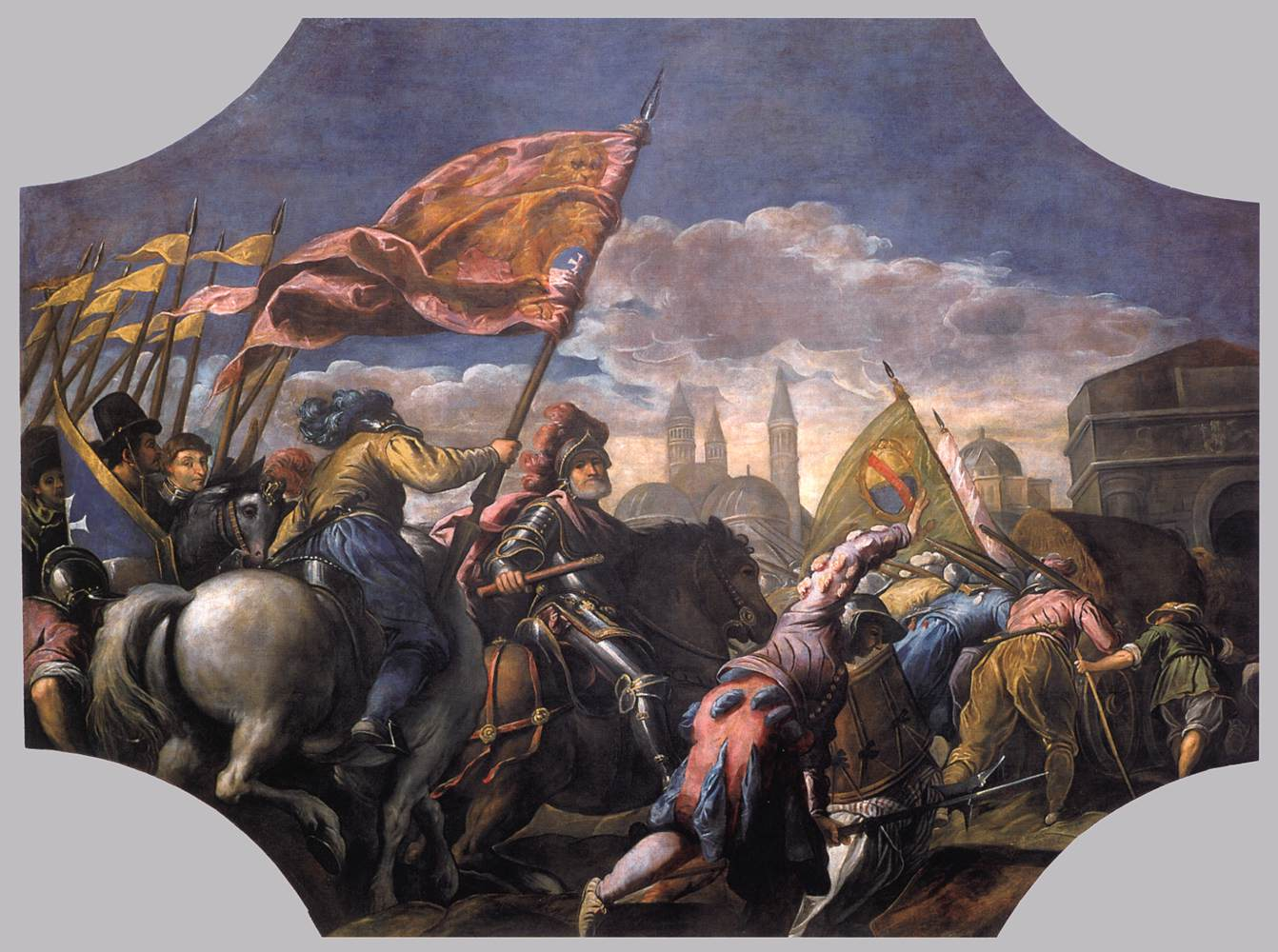
- Padua reconquered by Andrea Gritti and Giovanni Diedo, painting by Palma il Giovane in the Doge's Palace of Venice
Date	15–30 September 1509
Location	Padua, present-day Italy
Result	Venetian victory

Belligerents
Holy Roman Empire; Kingdom of France	Republic of Venice

Commanders and leaders
Maximilian I	Niccolò di Pitigliano; Andrea Gritti

Strength
50,000; 120–200 cannon	~15,000

The siege of Padua was a major engagement early in the War of the League of Cambrai.

Imperial forces had captured the Venetian city of Padua in June 1509. On 17 July, Venetian forces commanded by Andrea Gritti marched quickly from Treviso with a contingent of stradioti and retook the city, which had been garrisoned by some landsknechts hired by Emperor Maximilian I. In response, the emperor raised an army, composed mainly of mercenaries, and decided to invade the Veneto in an attempt to reclaim it.

In early August 1509, Maximilian set out from Trento with some 50,000 men and headed south into Venetian territory; there he was joined by French and German contingents. Due to a lack of horses, and generally poor organization, the army did not reach Padua until mid-September, which allowed the Venetian commander Niccolò di Pitigliano to concentrate what remained of Venice's army after Agnadello, as well as several companies of volunteers from Venice, in the city. This brought the defenders up to 14,000 infantry, 600 cavalry, and 700 stradiotti.

The siege began on 15 September. For two weeks, Imperial and French artillery bombarded the city, successfully breaching the walls; but the attacking troops were driven back by determined Venetian resistance when they attempted to enter. An assault by 7,500 Landsknechts in the Codalunga sector of the walls (the one that was most bombarded during the siege) was repulsed by mercenary commander Citolo da Perugia, whose mines killed 300 attackers and injured 400 others. By 30 September, Maximilian, unable to pay his mercenaries, lifted the siege; leaving a small detachment in Italy under Rudolph IV, Prince of Anhalt-Dessau, he withdrew to Tyrol with the main part of his army.

The defeat was a major loss of face for Maximilian, and the Holy Roman Empire would not attempt another invasion of Italy until 1516.

== Sources ==
- Hill, George (2010). A History of Cyprus. Vol. 3. Cambridge University Press.
- Shaw, Christine (2006). Italy and the European Powers: The Impact of War, 1500-1530. Brill. ISBN 978 90 04 15163 5.
