= Bartolomeo d'Alviano =

Venetian mercenary commander (1455–1515)

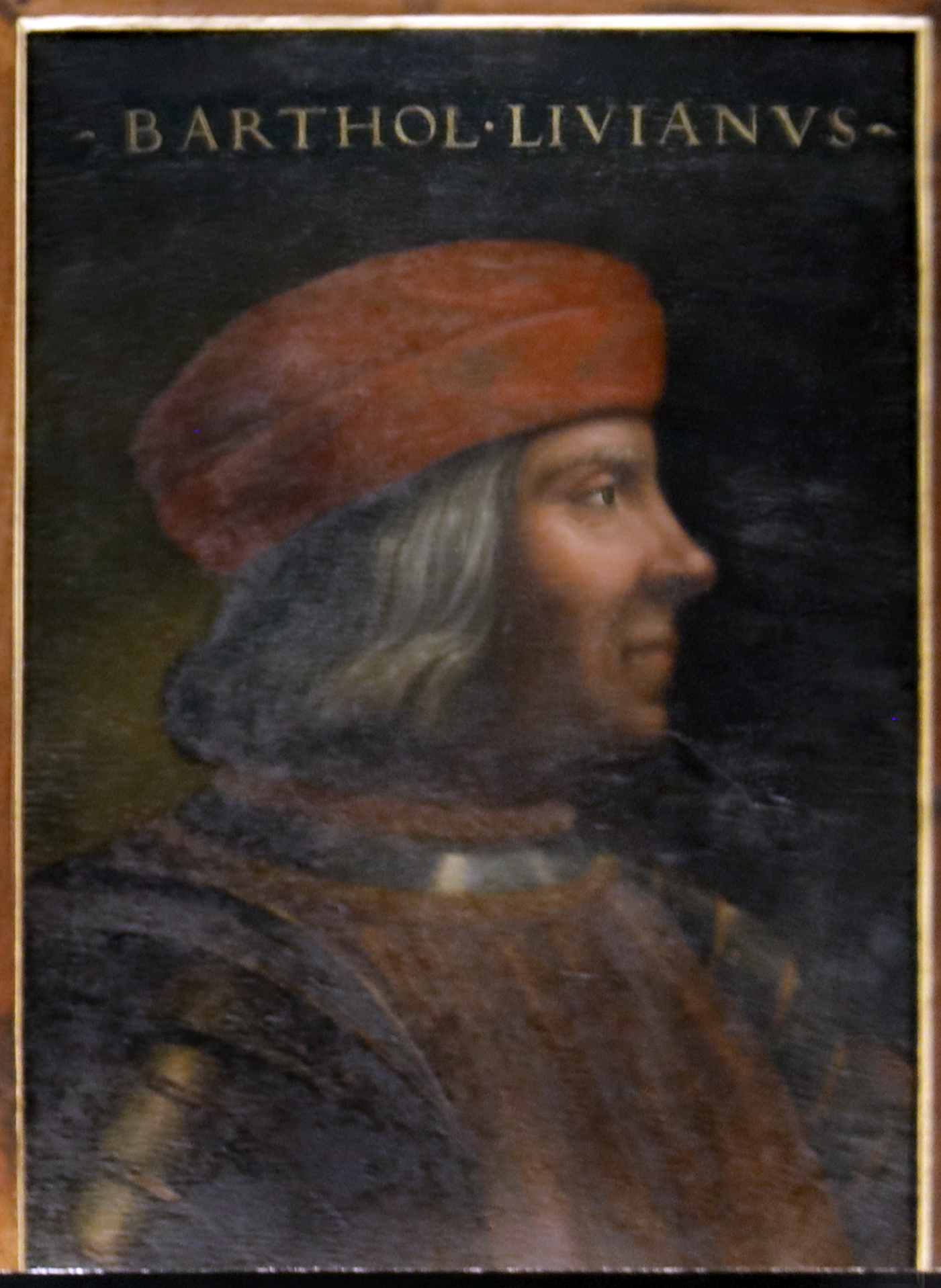
- Poortrait of Bartolomeo d'Alviano by Cristofano dell'Altissimo

Count of Alviano
- In office 1495–1515
- Preceded by: Francesco d'Alviano
- Succeeded by: Livio d'Alviano

Lord of Pordenone
- In office 1508–1515
- Succeeded by: Livio d'Alviano

Personal details
- Born: c. 1455 Todi, Papal States
- Died: 7 October 1515 (aged 59–60) Ghedi, Republic of Venice
- Resting place: Chiesa di Santo Stefano di Venezia
- Spouses: Bartolomea Orsini; Pantasilea Baglioni
- Children: Marco, Livio, Lucrezia, Isabella, Porzia
- Parents: Francesco d'Alviano (father); Isabella degli Atti (mother)

Military service
- Allegiance: Pontifical States; Kingdom of Aragon; Republic of Venice
- Branch/service: Mercenary
- Years of service: 1496–1515
- Rank: Condottiero
- Battles/wars: Italian Wars of 1499–1504; Battle of Garigliano; War of the League of Cambrai; Battle of Cadore; Battle of San Vincenzo; Battle of Agnadello; Battle of La Motta; Battle of Marignano; Battle of Brescia

Bartolomeo d'Alviano (c. 1455 – October 1515) was an Italian condottiero and captain famous for his role in the Italian Wars. A vassal to the Orsini, he served later the Catholic Monarchs of Spain under the Great Captain before deserting for the service of the Republic of Venice.

== Biography ==
Bartolomeo d'Alviano was born in 1455 to a noble family in Umbria at Todi to Francesco d'Alviano and Isabella degli Atti. He fought very early in his life in Central Italy, serving in the Papal States and, in 1496, the Orsini family against Pope Alexander VI and the Colonna. In May 1497, Bartolomeo massacred Ghibellines in Todi while reinstalling the Guelfs. The next year he entered the service of Venice until 1503 when he joined the Orsini.

Bartolomeo was then hired by Ferdinand II of Spain. He distinguished himself in the victory at the Battle of Garigliano over the French army, which started the Spanish domination over southern Italy. In 1506, he returned to the Republic of Venice; he would remain in its service until his death. The following year Bartolomeo defeated the Imperial Army of Maximilian I, Holy Roman Emperor, in Cadore (2 March 1508), at Mauria and Pontebba, conquering Gorizia and Trieste. Pordenone also fell in the same year, and the Serenissima assigned the city's signory to d'Alviano himself, which was ruled by the d'Alviano family until 1539.

In 1509 (the year he began the construction of new city walls at Padua), Bartolomeo was defeated at the Battle of Agnadello while commanding the advance guard, being wounded as a result. After Nicolo Orsini, his co-commander of the Venetian army, refused to come to his aid, he was captured by the French. He remained a prisoner until 1513 when an alliance between France and Venice was formed against the Duchy of Milan. Bartolomeo was chosen as the commander-in-chief of the Venetian Army after being released, and fought under the French commander Louis de la Trémoille. He was defeated at the Battle of La Motta by the Spanish viceroy of Naples Ramón de Cardona and marquis of Pescara Fernando d'Ávalos.

Later, Bartolomeo again conquered and sacked Pordenone, which had fallen again to the House of Habsburg. In 1513-14, during the War of the Holy League, he captured Friuli for Venice. He subsequently played a major role in the French victory in the Battle of Marignano (September 1515), in which he attacked the Swiss mercenaries with a corps of only 300 knights. Later also he managed to conquer Bergamo, but died in October of the same year during the siege of Brescia.

Bartolomeo was buried in the church of Santo Stefano in Venice.

== Personal life ==
In 1497, he married Bartolomea Orsini. Some time later, he married Pantasilea Baglioni, sister of Gian Paolo Baglioni, who was locked at Todi fortress with their children, but the Pope and Duke of Valentinois ordered their freedom.

== In fiction ==
A fictional version of Bartolomeo d'Alviano appears in the video games Assassin's Creed II, Assassin's Creed: Project Legacy and Assassin's Creed: Brotherhood as a member of the Order of Assassins. His second wife, Pantasilea Baglioni, also appears as a member in Brotherhood.

== Bibliography ==
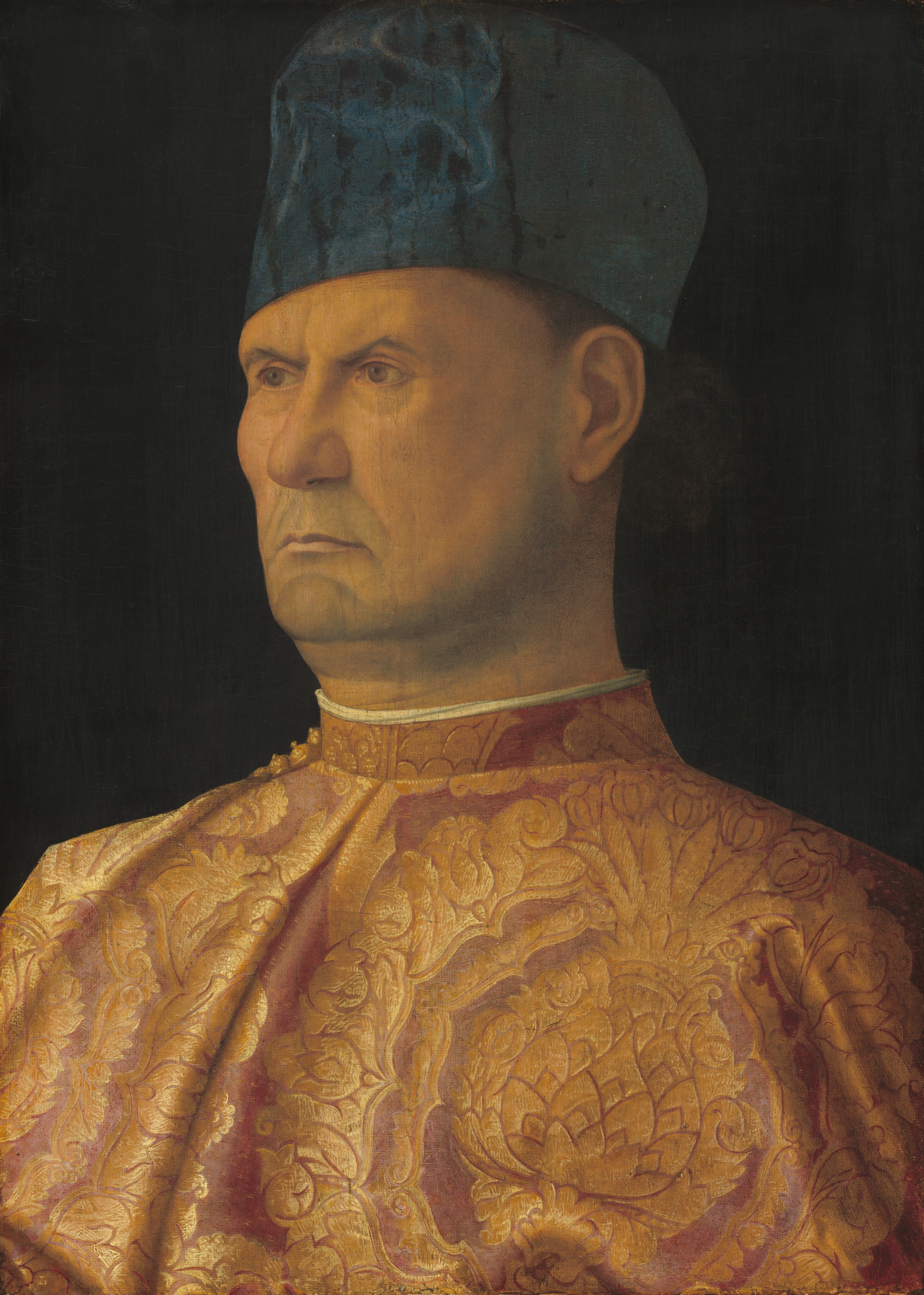
Possible portrait of Bartolome d'Alviano by Giovanni Bellini.

- Black, Jeremy (2005). European Warfare, 1494-1660. Taylor & Francis.
- Bowd, Stephen D (2018). Renaissance Mass Murder: Civilians and Soldiers During the Italian Wars. Oxford University Press.
- Deutscher, Thomas Brian (2003). "Bartolomeo d'Alviano". In Bietenholz, Peter G.; Deutscher, Thomas Brian (eds.). Contemporaries of Erasmus: A Biographical Register of the Renaissance and Reformation. Vol. 1–3. University of Toronto Press.
- Finlay, Robert (1982). "The Foundation of the Ghetto: Venice, the Jews, and the War of the League of Cambrai". Proceedings of the American Philosophical Society. 126 (2 (8 Apr.)). American Philosophical Society: 140–154.
- Mallett, Michael Edward; Shaw, Christine (2014). The Italian Wars 1494-1559: War, State and Society in Early Modern Europe. Taylor & Francis. ISBN 978-1-317-89939-6.
- Molmenti, Pompeo [in Italian] (1907). Venice: Its Individual Growth from the Earliest Beginnings to the Fall of the Republic. Vol. 2. Translated by Brown, Horatio Forbes. J. Murray. p. 208.
- Shaw, Christine (2014). Barons and Castellans: The Military Nobility of Renaissance Italy. Brill.
- Tewes, Götz-Rüdiger (2011). Kampf um Florenz: die Medici im Exil (1494-1512) (in German). Böhlau.
- Rendina, Claudio (1994). I capitani di ventura. Rome: Newton & Compton.
