= Niccolò di Pitigliano =

Italian military leader

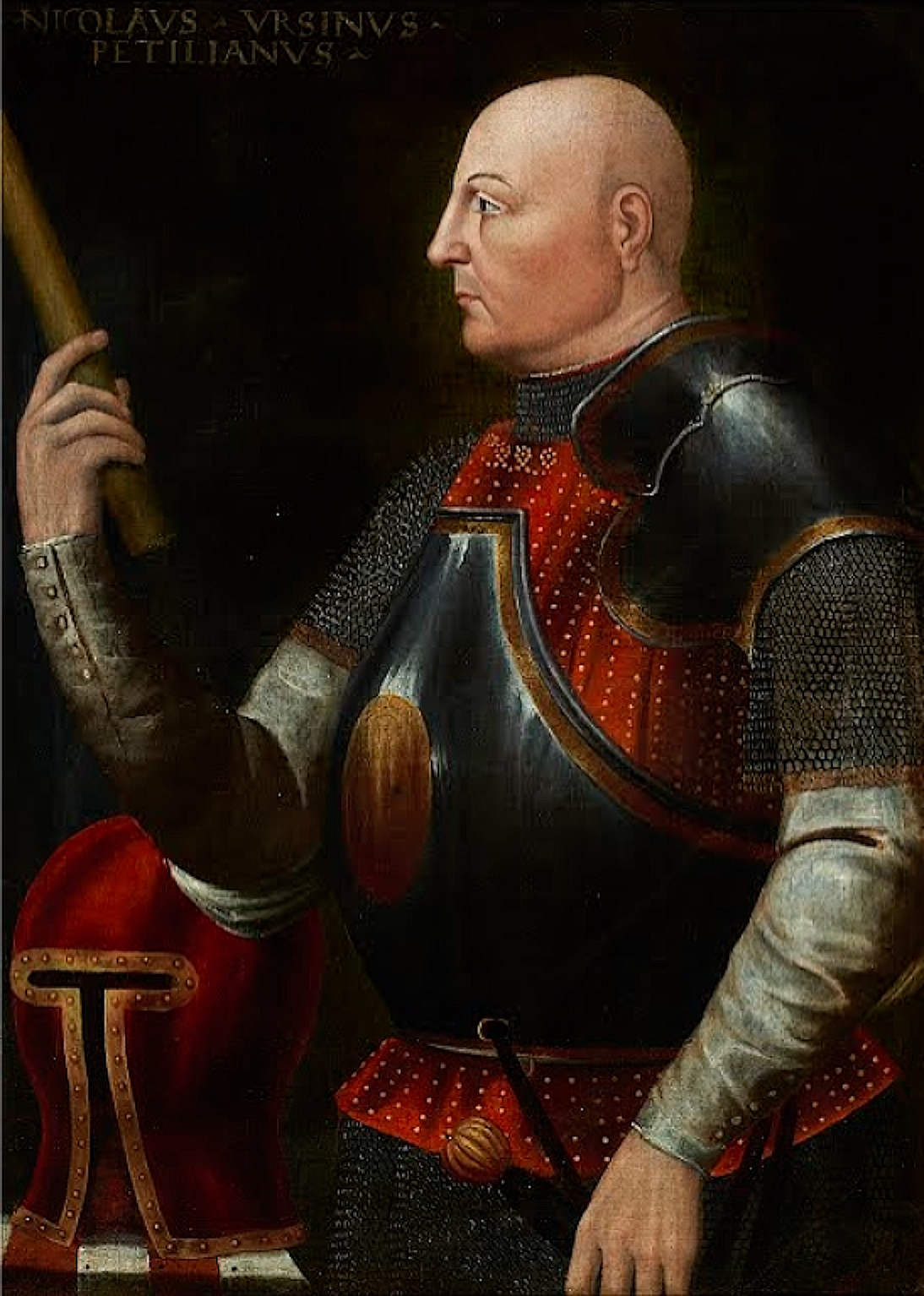
Portrait of Niccolò Orsini, Pinacoteca civica di Como

Niccolò di Pitigliano (1442–1510) was an Italian condottiero best known as the Captain-General of the Venetians during the Most Serene Republic's war against the League of Cambrai. He was a member of the powerful feudal family of the Orsini, belonging to its Pitigliano line.

== Biography ==
=== Early years ===
Niccolò di Pitigliano was born in Pitigliano, in the Maremma, the son of Aldobrandino Paioletti ll, Count of Pitigliano and his wife Bartolomea. He was the descendant of a Romano ["Romanello"] Orsini, Count of Nola, who had acquired the Signoria of the tiny Tuscan citystate of Pitigliano in 1293 by marrying Anastasia de Montfort, heiress of the Aldobrandeschi Lords of the city. His parents both came from different branches of the Orsini clan.

Equipped with the reputation that comes from a famous name, the connections and dynastic links with many of the ruling families of Italy, and with their own private fief as a base, both Niccolò Paioletti, and his father Aldobrandino Paioletti made careers as mercenaries taking Condotte (mercenary contracts) with Florence, Siena, the Pope, and the Kingdom of Naples at various times.

=== Career as a condottiero ===
A chronological list of Niccolò di Pitigliano's early contracts shows him moving among the same employers and taking service with the same State more than once.

Niccolò di Pitigliano's significant Condotte were as follows:

- 1458 – Papacy
- 1463 – Kingdom of Naples
- 1473 – Florence, with the rank of Field Marshal of the Republic
- 1481 – Kingdom of Naples
- 1482 – Papacy
- 1485 – Florence, with the rank of Captain General of the Republic (Florence's highest military rank)
- 1489 – Papacy, as Captain General of the Church
- 1495 – Venice

=== In Venetian service and the War of the League of Cambrai ===
From 1495 until the end of his life, Niccolò di Pitigliano remained in Venetian service as Governatore Generale delle Milizie Veneziane (Governor General of Venetian Forces). The high point of his career was the role that he played in the War between the Venetian Republic and the League of Cambrai.

In the first decade of the sixteenth century, Pope Julius II planned to curb the power of Venice in northern Italy and had, to this end, created the League of Cambrai (named after Cambrai, where the negotiations took place), an alliance against the Republic that included, besides himself, Louis XII of France, Emperor Maximilian I, and Ferdinand I of Spain.

On 15 April 1509, King Louis XII of France left Milan at the head of a French army and moved rapidly into Venetian territory. To oppose him, Venice fielded an army under the command of Niccolò di Pitigliano and his cousin Bartolomeo d'Alviano (also a scion of the Orsini clan).

Disagreements between Pitigliano and Alviano as the best way to stop the French advance prevented the two from uniting their forces to oppose the French. Consequently, when Louis crossed the Adda River in early May and Alviano advanced to meet him, Pitigliano moved away to the south, believing it best to avoid a pitched battle.

On 14 May, Alviano confronted the French at the Battle of Agnadello; outnumbered, he sent requests for reinforcements to his cousin, who replied with orders to break off the battle and continued on his way. Alviano, disregarding the new orders, continued the engagement; his army was eventually surrounded and destroyed.

Pitigliano managed to avoid encountering Louis; but his mercenary troops, hearing of Alviano's defeat, had deserted in large numbers by the next morning, forcing him to retreat to Treviso with the remnants of the Venetian army.

The Venetian collapse was complete; Louis proceeded to occupy Venetian territory as far east as Brescia without encountering any significant resistance. The major cities that had not been occupied by the French—Padua, Verona, and Vicenza—were left undefended by Pitigliano's withdrawal, and quickly surrendered to Maximilian when Imperial emissaries arrived in the Veneto.

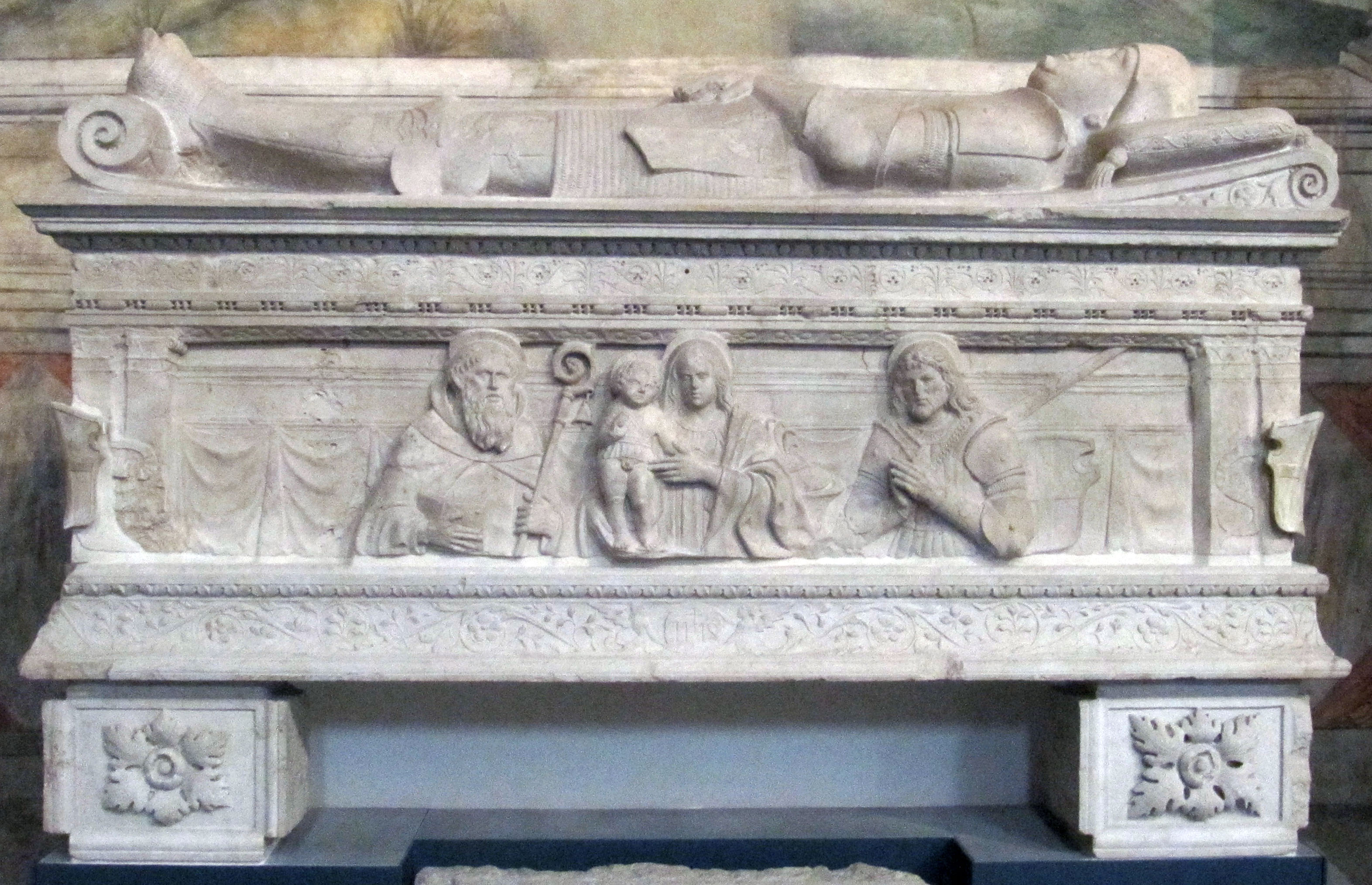
Tomb of Nicholas Orsini, Brescia, Santa Giulia Museum

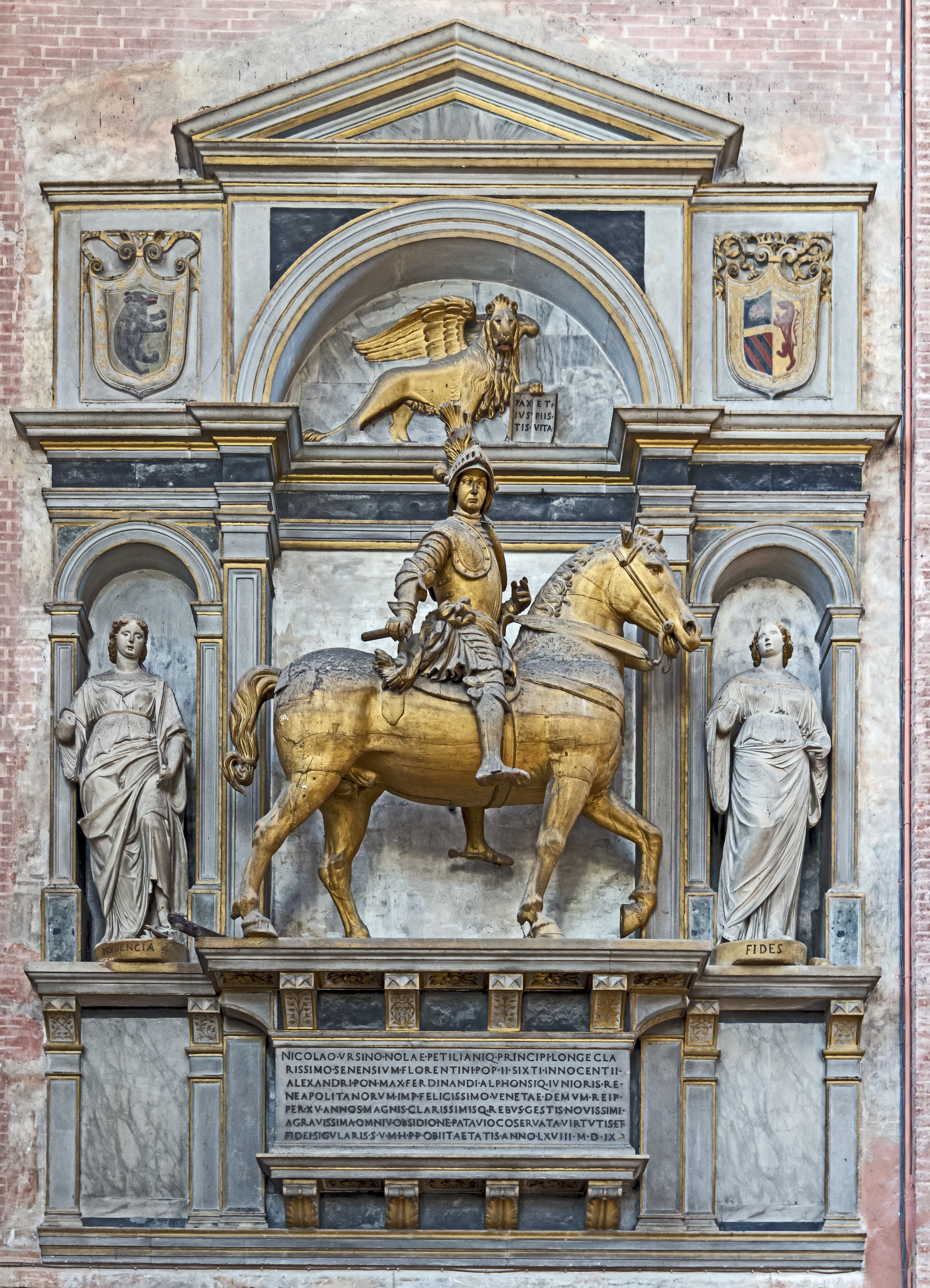
equestrian statue of Niccolò Orsini in San Zanipolo

Julius, having in the meantime issued an interdict against Venice that excommunicated every citizen of the Republic, invaded the Romagna and seized Ravenna with the assistance of the Duke of Ferrara, who had joined the League and seized the Polesine for himself.

The newly arrived Imperial governors, however, quickly proved to be unpopular. In mid-July, the citizens of Padua, aided by detachments of Venetian cavalry under the command of the proveditor Andrea Gritti, revolted; the landsknechts garrisoning the city were too few in number to mount effective resistance and Padua was restored to Venetian control on 17 July.

The success of the revolt finally pushed Maximilian into action. In early August, a massive Imperial army, accompanied by bodies of French and Spanish troops, set out from Trento into the Veneto. Because of a lack of horses, as well as general disorganization, Maximilian's forces would not reach Padua until September, giving Pitigliano the time to concentrate such troops as were still available to him in the city. The Siege of Padua began on 15 September; although French and Imperial artillery successfully breached Padua's walls, the defenders managed to hold the city until Maximilian, growing impatient, lifted the siege on 30 September and withdrew to Tyrol with the main part of his army.

In mid-November, Pitigliano returned to the offensive; Venetian troops easily defeated the remaining Imperial forces, capturing Vicenza, Este, Feltre, and Belluno. Although a subsequent attack on Verona failed, Pitigliano managed to destroy a Papal army under Francesco II of Gonzaga in the process.

A river attack on Ferrara by the Venetian galley fleet under Angelo Trevisan failed, however, when the Venetian ships, anchored in the Po River, were sunk by Ferrarese artillery; and a new French advance soon forced Pitigliano to withdraw to Padua once again.

The War of the League of Cambrai continued, but in January 1510, Niccolò di Pitigliano died in Lonigo. He was interred in the Basilica di San Giovanni e Paolo, a traditional burial place of the doges.

== Family ==
Niccolò di Pitigliano was married twice.

Firstly, in 1467, to Elena dei Conti Montalcino (died in Nola in 1504), with nine children including:

- Francesca (born 1469, died 1562), who married Don Sigismondo Carafa, Prince of Aliano in 1500
- Ludovico (died 1534) who succeeded him as Count of Pitigliano.

His connection with the Carafa family is shown by his presence in the Dispute of St. Thomas painted by Filippino Lippi in the Carafa Chapel, in the basilica of Santa Maria sopra Minerva, Rome.

Secondly to Guglielmina, a commoner of humble birth, last attested to in a will of 1529.
