= Battle of Polesella =

Battle between the Duchy of Ferrara and the Republic of Venice in December 1509

Coordinates: 44°58′N 11°47′E

- Part of the War of the League of Cambrai
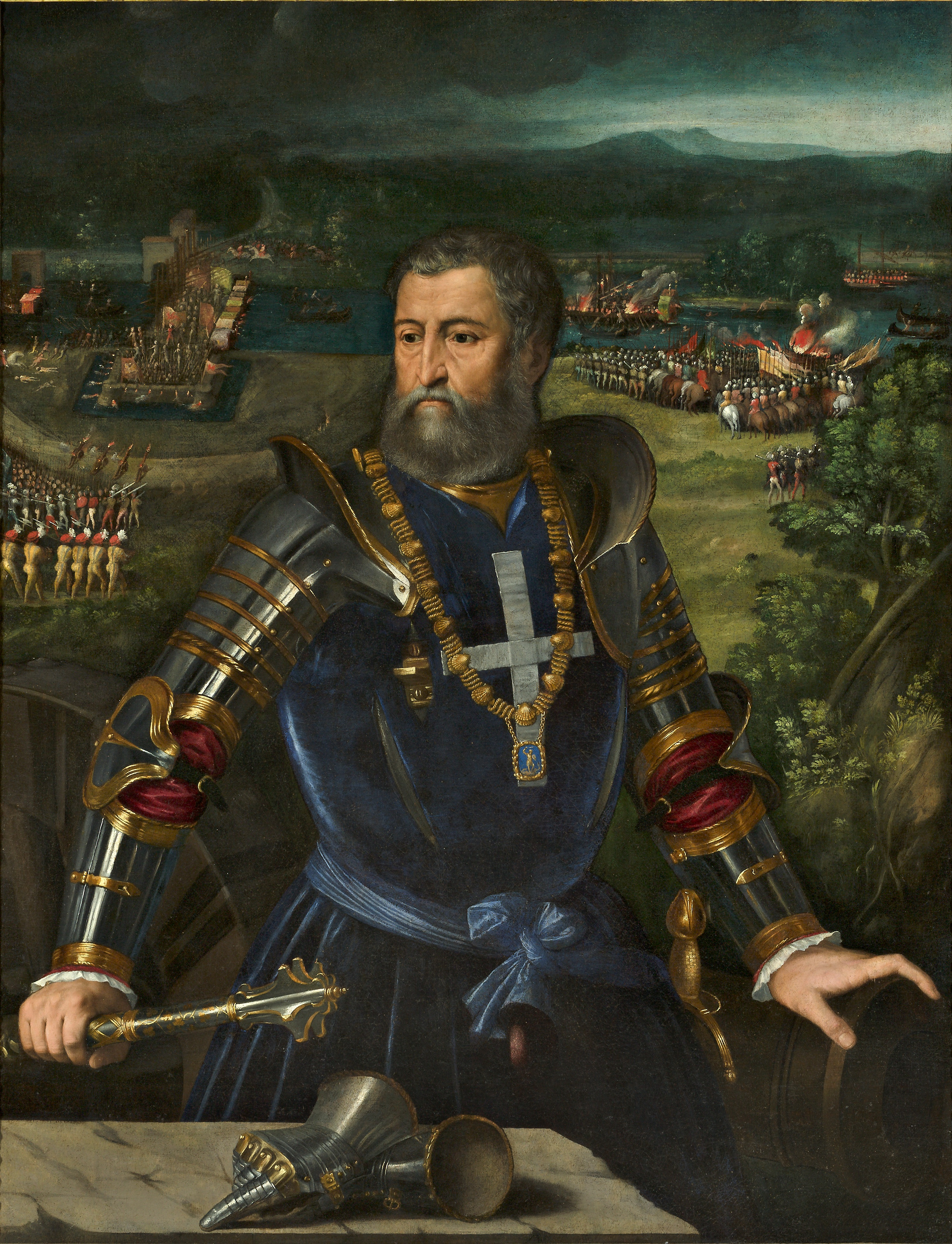
- Battle of Polesella
Date	22 December 1509
Location	Polesella, present-day Italy
Result	Ferrarese victory

Belligerents
Duchy of Ferrara	Republic of Venice

Commanders and leaders
Cardinal d'Este; Alfonso I d'Este	Angelo Trevisan

Strength
Unknown number of artillery	Unknown

Casualties and losses
Light	2,000 killed 15 galleys captured 60 flags captured

The Battle of Polesella, fought on 22 December 1509, by forces of the Duchy of Ferrara and the Republic of Venice, was a naval battle on the River Po in the War of the League of Cambrai in the Italian Wars. It was an overwhelming victory for Ferrara.

== Battle ==
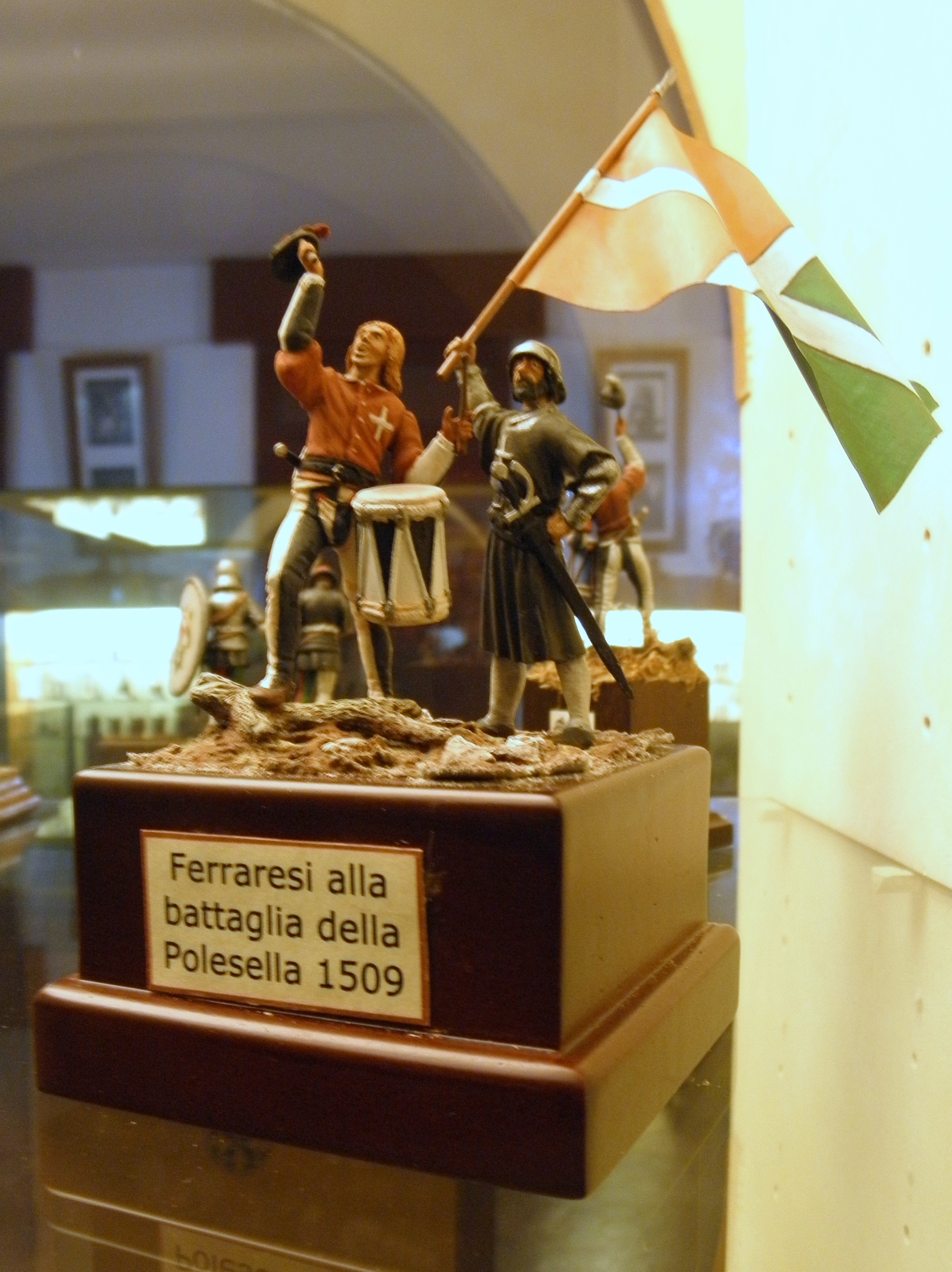
Voghiera, Museo del modellismo storico: small diorama of soldiers of Duchy of Ferrara at the time of battle.

In 1509, the Venetian fleet was moored on the river Po, waiting for the right moment to attack Ferrara. Meanwhile, the Slavic and Albanian mercenaries (called Stratioti) made daily incursions into the Dukedom, sowing death and terror.

On the night of 21–22 December, given the high level reached by the waters of the Po, that had brought the enemy galleys up to the level of the embankment, the Ferrarese forces set up their artillery along the river and at dawn opened fire. In the indescribable chaos that followed this surprise action, many ships were sunk and others captured. The soldiers and sailors who tried to escape into the water were taken prisoner and shot or killed without mercy as soon as they reached firm ground. It was rather a massacre than a battle.

The troops of Ferrara captured 15 galleys and a number of other ships. The Venetians lost 2,000 killed or drowned and 60 flags.

Angelo Trevisan succeeded in fleeing, but his damaged galley sank 5 km further. Back in Venice, he was tried for "misconduct and carelessness". When Duke Alfonso I d'Este entered Ferrara five days later, his wife Lucrezia Borgia was waiting for him with her maids of honour, the court, and the jubilant population.

The battle was described by Ludovico Ariosto in his epic poem Orlando Furioso (canto 40, 2, vv. 1–4).
