= Casaloldo =

Casaloldo Casalolt (Emilian)
- Comune
- Comune di Casaloldo
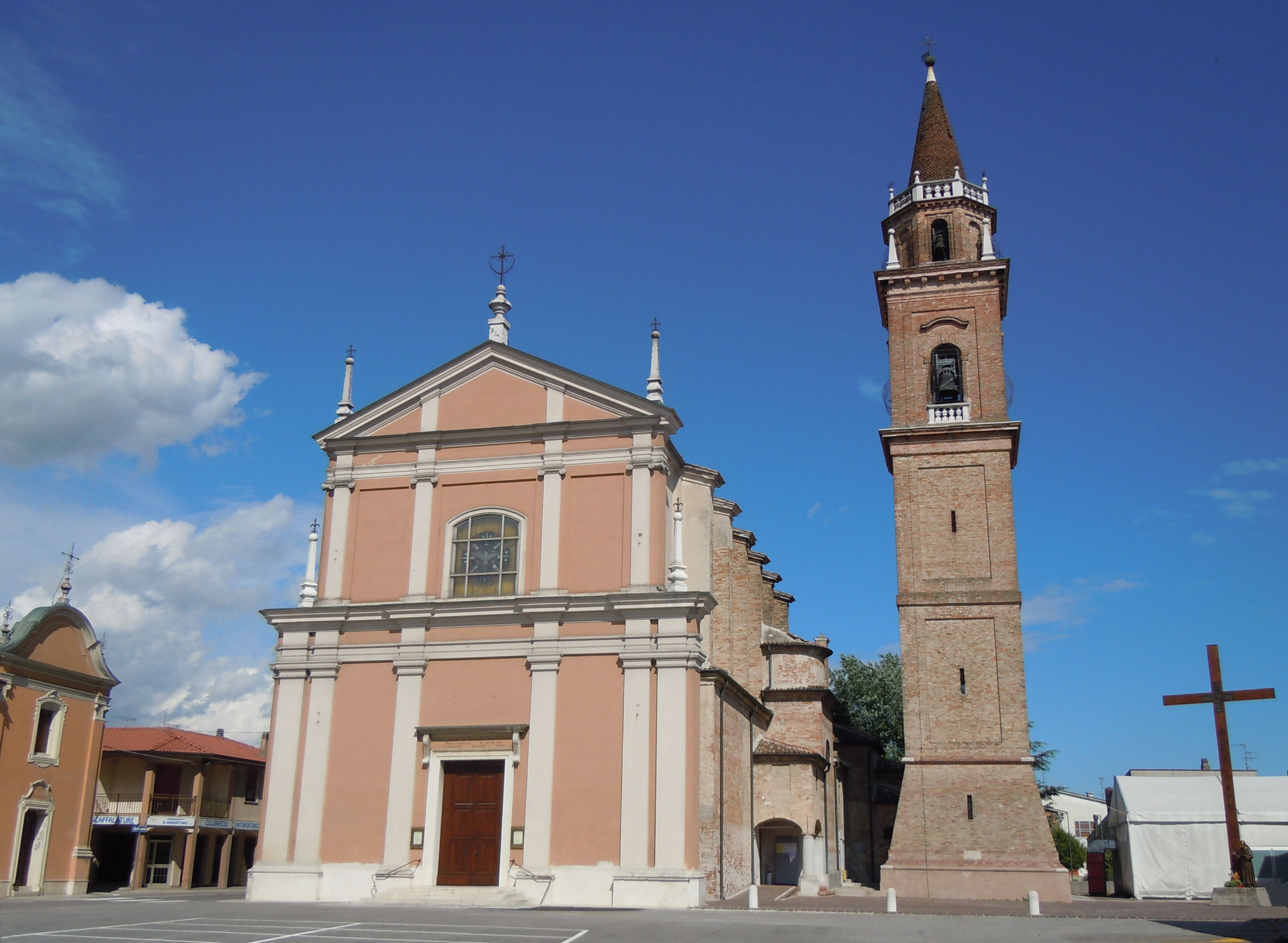

- Location within Italy Location within Lombardy
- Coordinates: 45°15′N 10°29′E
- Country: Italy
- Region: Lombardy
- Province: Province of Mantua (MN)

Area
  - Total: 16.8 km^{2} (6.5 sq mi)

Population (Dec. 2004)
  - Total: 2,436
  - Density: 145/km^{2} (376/sq mi)
- Time zone: UTC+1 (CET)
  - Summer (DST): UTC+2 (CEST)
- Postal code: 46040
- Dialing code: 0376
- Website: Official website

Casaloldo (Upper Mantovano: Casalolt) is a comune (municipality) in the Province of Mantua in the Italian region Lombardy, located about 110 kilometres (68 mi) east of Milan and about 25 kilometres (16 mi) northwest of Mantua. As of 31 December 2004, it had a population of 2,436 and an area of 16.8 square kilometres (6.5 mi^{2}).

Casaloldo borders the following municipalities: Asola, Castel Goffredo, Ceresara, Piubega.

== Demographic evolution ==
Historical population

Year	Pop.	±%
1861	1,249	—
1871	1,322	+5.8%
1881	1,338	+1.2%
1901	1,494	+11.7%
1911	1,758	+17.7%

Year	Pop.	±%
1921	1,899	+8.0%
1931	1,943	+2.3%
1936	2,036	+4.8%
1951	1,985	−2.5%
1961	1,802	−9.2%

Year	Pop.	±%
1971	1,757	−2.5%
1981	1,878	+6.9%
1991	1,925	+2.5%
2001	2,174	+12.9%

Source: Data from ISTAT
