= League of Cambrai =

Military coalition against Venice, 1508–1511

- 1508–1511
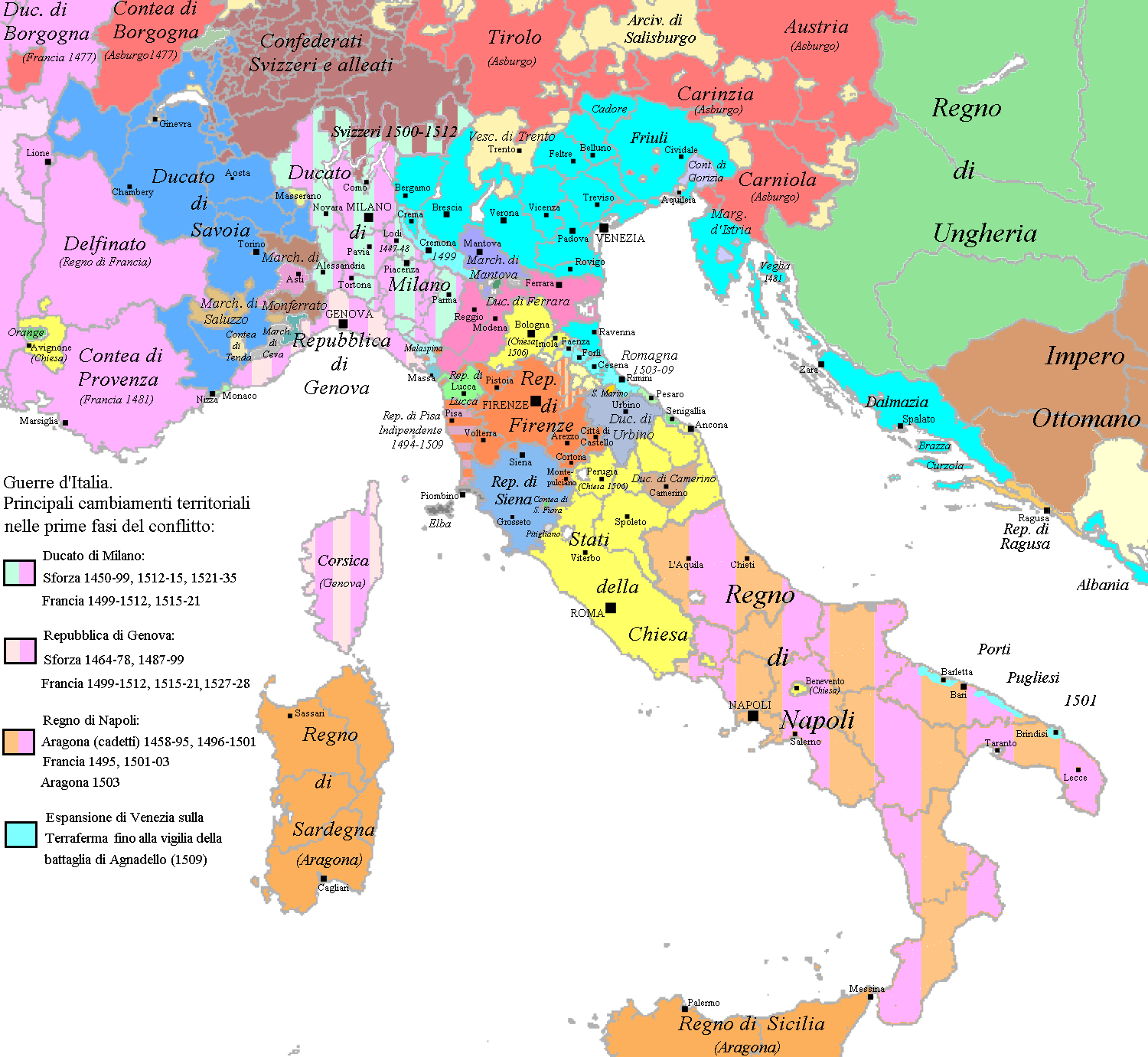
- Italy during the contemporary conflicts, that included the War of the League of Cambrai
- Status: Military coalition
- Membership: Papal States; Kingdom of France; Holy Roman Empire; Crown of Aragon; Duchy of Ferrara; Duchy of Savoy; Kingdom of Hungary
- Historical era: Early modern period
  - Established: 10 December 1508
  - Dissolved: 4 October 1511

The League of Cambrai was a military coalition against the Republic of Venice formed on 10 December 1508, by the main European powers, the Holy Roman Empire and the Kingdom of France, in order to expand their hegemony over the Italian Peninsula. The League was formalized by two treaties, both signed on 10 December 1508 in Cambrai, first being a dynastic treaty between Habsburg and Valois rulers, and the second being a wider treaty of military alliance against the Venetians. It gave its name to the War of the League of Cambrai (1508–1511). In March 1509, the League was joined by the Crown of Aragon, and also by Pope Julius II, who issued an interdict against the Venetians on 27 April. Already in 1510 the League was left by the Pope, who sided with the Venetians. In 1511 the League continued to dissolve, being abandoned by the king of Aragon, and it finally collapsed in 1512 when the emperor concluded truce with the Venetians, thus leaving the French to continue the war alone.

== Treaties of Cambrai ==
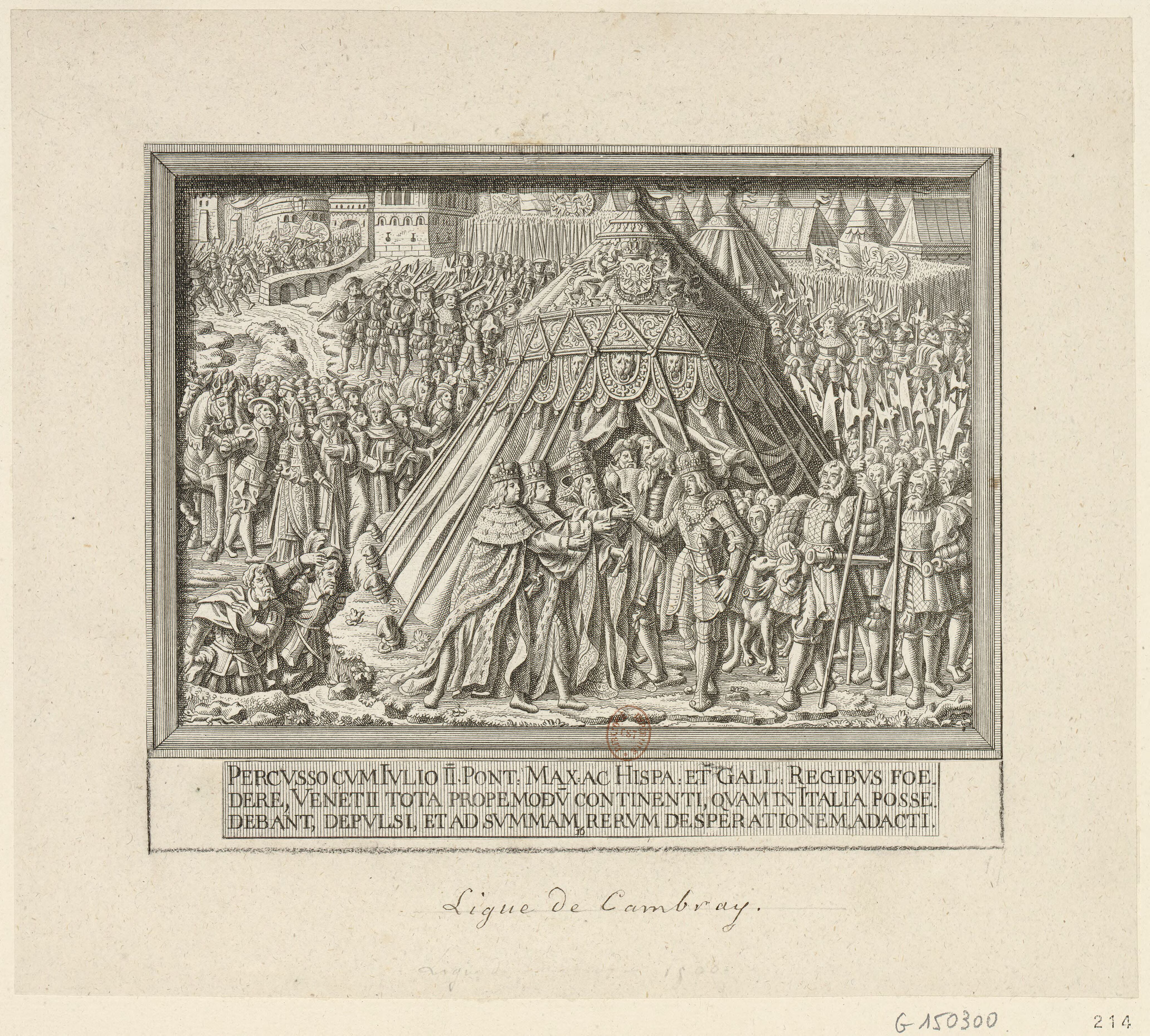
An artistic and symbolic depiction of the conclusion of the League of Cambrai (1508), representing allied rulers in concord (emperor, pope, and both kings), while non of them was personally present at Cambrai

In the autumn of 1508, imperial and French delegations met at Cambrai. Rulers were not present in person. The emperor was represented by his daughter, archduchess Margaret of Austria (governess of the Habsburg Netherlands), who was accompanied by Mercurino di Gattinara (president of the Burgundian parliament) and Matthäus Lang von Wellenburg (at that time bishop of Gurk). The French king and his allies were represented by cardinal Georges d'Amboise (the archbishop of Rouen), Étienne de Poncher (the bishop of Paris), and Alberto III Pio, Lord of Carpi. Negotiations resulted in the conclusion of two treaties, that were both signed by the archduchess and the cardinal.

=== The dynastic Treaty of Cambrai ===
The first (dynastic) treaty was concluded on 10 December 1508 in Cambrai, on behalf of the emperor Maximilian I and king Louis XII, with participation of the young prince Charles (future emperor Charles V), and also including the French ally Charles II, Duke of Guelders. The treaty thus established an alliance between Habsburg and Valois courts, and also resolved various territorial questions, regarding the Kingdom of Navarre, the Duchy of Milan, the Duchy of Guelders, the County of Flanders, the County of Artois, the County of Charolais and several minor domains, related mainly to previous settlements, such as the Treaty of Arras (1482) and the Treaty of Senlis (1493), that were concluded in order to resolve initial disputes over the Burgundian inheritance.

=== The military Treaty of Cambrai ===
The second (military) treaty, that was concluded on the same day, created a wider league, that was officially defined as an anti-Ottoman alliance, while in fact was established (by secret clauses) as an anti-Venetian league. The initial and additional members of the League were: Maximilian I (Holy Roman Emperor), Louis XII (King of France), Ferdinand II of Aragon (King of Naples and Sicily), Julius II (Sovereign of the Papal States), Alfonso I d'Este (Duke of Ferrara), Carlo III (Duke of Savoy), Francesco II Gonzaga (Marquess of Mantua) and (invited to join the League) Vladislaus II (King of Hungary).

In its preamble, a stated pretext for the treaty is peace between the Holy Roman Emperor and the Duke of Guelders, mediated by Papal and Spanish ambassadors. The following was also remarked against the Venetian Republic:

[...] to stop the losses, the abuses, the robberies, the harms which the Venetians have caused not only to the Holy Apostolic See, but also to the Holy Roman Empire, to the House of Austria, to the Dukes of Milan, to the Kings of Naples and to many others principles occupying and usurping tyrannically their goods, their lands, their cities and their castles, as if they had conspired to the ill of everyone [...] So we found not only useful and honorable, but also necessary to call everyone to a right revenge to turn off, like a common fire, the Venetians' insatiable greed and their thirst for domination.

— Maximilian I, Treaty of Cambrai, Preamble

The Treaty of Cambrai stipulated the following partition of Venice's mainland and overseas territories:

- to the Holy Roman Empire: Treviso, Padua, Vicenza, Verona, Friuli, and Istria
- to the Kingdom of France: Brescia, Bergamo, Crema, Cremona, and Gera d'Adda
- to the Crown of Aragon: Trani, Brindisi, Otranto and Gallipoli
- to the Papal States: Ravenna, Cervia, Rimini, Faenza and its castles, and also some possessions near Cesena and Imola
- to the Duchy of Ferrara: Polesine, Este, and Scodosia di Montagna
- to the Marquisate of Mantua: Peschiera, Asola, and Lonato
- to the Duchy of Savoy, if it joined the alliance: Cyprus
- to the Kingdom of Hungary, if it joined the alliance: Dalmatia

== Evolution of the League ==
Allegory of the League of Cambrai. At the top, there is a two-headed eagle and a porcupine representing the Holy Roman Empire and Louis XII of France respectively. Quills from the purcupine are shot at a lion representing Venise, hitting it. Below, there are two dogs representing Ferdinand of Aragon beside an oak tree representing Pope Julius II.

The League fought against the Venetians between the spring of 1509 and the autumn of 1511. At first, all members of the League were committed to its causes, and actively participated in military and diplomatic endeavors against the Venetians.

By the autumn of 1509, the Pope became suspicious of French ambitions in Italy, and decided to initiate negotiations with Venice. On 24 March 1510, an agreement was reached between Julius II and the Venetians, and the interdict was revoked. Thus, the Pope has effectively abandoned the League of Cambrai, but without siding with the Venetians, while other members of the League continued their war against Venice.

In the summer of 1510, turning openly against his former French ally, the Pope concluded an anti-French alliance with the Venetians, but without entering into direct conflict against other remaining members of the League, the Crown of Aragon and the Holy Roman Empire. In order to destroy the League, Julius II initiated separate negotiations with king Ferdinand and emperor Maximilian. Thus in 1511, the king of Aragon decided to abandon the League and join the Pope and the Venetians in a new anti-French alliance called the Holy League, that was proclaimed by the Pope on 4 October 1511.

The Holy League was also opened for the emperor, but Maximilian was hesitant to join and turn against the French. Only after Pope's mediation, the truce was concluded in Rome between envoys of the emperor and the Venetian doge, on 6 April 1512. The truce was ratified by Maximilian on 20 May, thus marking the end of emperor's participation in the war against Venice, as set out in 1508 by the creation of the League of Cambrai, that finally fell apart.

By that time, the conflict in Italy already entered into a new phase, known as the War of the Holy League (1511–1514).

== Sources ==
- Ard Boone, Rebecca (2016) [2014]. Mercurino di Gattinara and the Creation of the Spanish Empire. London & New York: Routledge.
- Baumgartner, Frederic J. (1994). Louis XII. New York: St. Martin's Press.
- Blockmans, Wim (2001). Emperor Charles V: 1500–1558. London: Bloomsbury Academic.
- Guicciardini, Francesco (1984) [1969]. The History of Italy. Princeton: Princeton University Press.
- Laffan, Robert George D. (1975) [1957]. "The Empire under Maximilian I". The New Cambridge Modern History. Vol. 1. Cambridge: Cambridge University Press. pp. 194–223.
- Lesaffer, Randall, ed. (2004). Peace Treaties and International Law in European History: From the Late Middle Ages to World War One. Cambridge: Cambridge University Press.
- Mallett, Michael (1984). The Military Organization of a Renaissance State: Venice c. 1400 to 1617. Cambridge: Cambridge University Press.
- Mallett, Michael; Shaw, Christine (2014) [2012]. The Italian Wars 1494-1559: War, State and Society in Early Modern Europe. London and New York: Routledge.
- Norwich, John J. (1982). A History of Venice. New York: Knopf.
- Potter, David L. (1995). A History of France, 1460–1560: The Emergence of a Nation. Basingstoke: Macmillan.
- Setton, Kenneth M. (1984). The Papacy and the Levant (1204-1571). Vol. 3. Philadelphia: American Philosophical Society.
- Taylor, Frederick L. (1921). The Art of War in Italy 1494-1529. Cambridge: The University Press.
