= Adoration of the Holy Name of Jesus =

Painting by El Greco in the Escorial

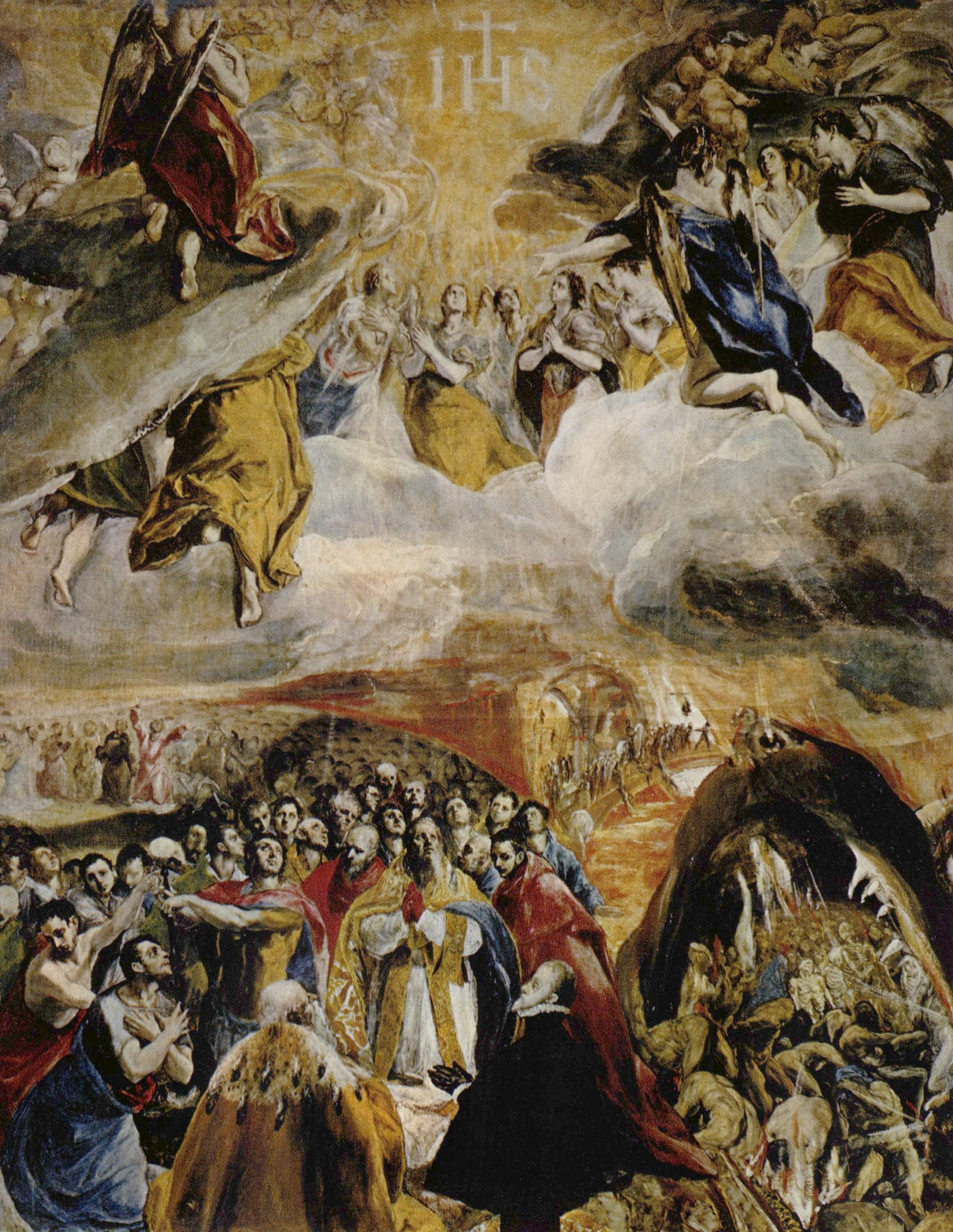
- Artist: El Greco
- Year: 1577-1579
- Medium: oil on canvas
- Dimensions: 140 cm × 110 cm (55 in × 43 in)
- Location: Royal Collections Gallery, Madrid

Adoration of the Holy Name of Jesus is a 1577-1579 oil on canvas painting by El Greco, produced early in his Toledo period. It is also known in modern scholarship as La Gloria, The Dream of Philip II, or Allegory of the Holy League. Originally held at El Escorial, the piece has been in exhibition at the Royal Collections Gallery in Madrid since its opening in 2023.

== Description ==
The piece depicts the nominal adoration of the Holy Name of Jesus. Beside Philip II, who likely had some part in commissioning the painting, are Pope Pius V and doge Sebastiano Venier, founders of the Holy League, and Don John of Austria, victor of the battle of Lepanto, all kneeling and worshipping the Holy Name of Jesus in the upper register, where it is surrounded by angels. In the bottom right is a hell-mouth in the form of Leviathan, influenced by Hieronymus Bosch. The coloring also shows the influence of the Venetian school and Michelangelo on the artist.

Hugh Trevor-Roper writes, "Clearly it is based on Titian's Gloria...."

== Other versions ==
The National Gallery, London holds a preparatory sketch for it.

== Legacy ==
Aldous Huxley's essay "Meditation on El Greco" interprets the leviathan in the bottom right of the painting as a "significantly autobiographical object". Huxley writes, "Paradise and Purgatory, Hell, and even the common Earth for El Greco in his artistic maturity, every department of the universe, was situated in the belly of a whale. His Annunciations and Assumptions, his Agonies and Transfigurations and Crucifixions, his Martyrdoms and Stigmatizations are all, without exception, visceral events." "So far as [El Greco] is concerned," he writes, "there is nothing outside the whale."

== See also ==
- List of works by El Greco

== Bibliography ==
- Huxley, Aldous (1949). "Meditation on El Greco," Music at Night. Chatto & Windus. ISBN 0701108096.
- Puppi, Lionello (1967). El Greco. Grosset & Dunlap. ISBN 9788431005528.
- Troutman, Philip (1963). El Greco. Marboro Books. ISBN 0600037703.
