= Portrait of Doge Andrea Gritti =

Painting by Titian

- Artist: Titian
- Year: c. 1546–1550
- Medium: Oil on canvas
- Dimensions: 133.6 cm × 103.2 cm (52.6 in × 40.6 in)
- Location: National Gallery of Art; Washington, D.C.
- Accession: 1961.9.45

Portrait of Doge Andrea Gritti is an oil painting by the Venetian master Titian, painted in the late 1540s, which is part of the collection of the National Gallery of Art in Washington, D.C. It is a portrait of Andrea Gritti, who was doge of Venice from 1523 to his death in 1538. A posthumous portrait, it is likely based on earlier depictions of the Doge, including one executed by Titian between 1537 and 1540 for Sala del Maggior Consiglio and destroyed during a fire in 1577.

== Description ==
Gritti is portrayed about down to his hips, wearing the Doge's cap and a robe of State glittering with gold; he gazes attentively to the left with a somewhat severe expression about his firmly-closed mouth. His clenched hand appears from under his broad sleeve. The play of light on the gold brocade, the broad stripe of white fur lining, the white beard and the gold lace on the ducal cap are used as bits of colour. The eyes, partly in shadow under projecting brows, are made the central point of an impressive personality. The work is signed "Titianus E. F."

== Date ==
Attributed by Crowe and Cavalcaselle to Pordenone; according to Gronau, this seems in no way probable. The style of this work indicates not the earlier period of the reign of the Doge (1523 to 1538); it approaches more the portraits done after 1540 (as Aretino's in the Pitti). The National Gallery of Art dates to work to between 1546 and 1550.

== Analysis ==
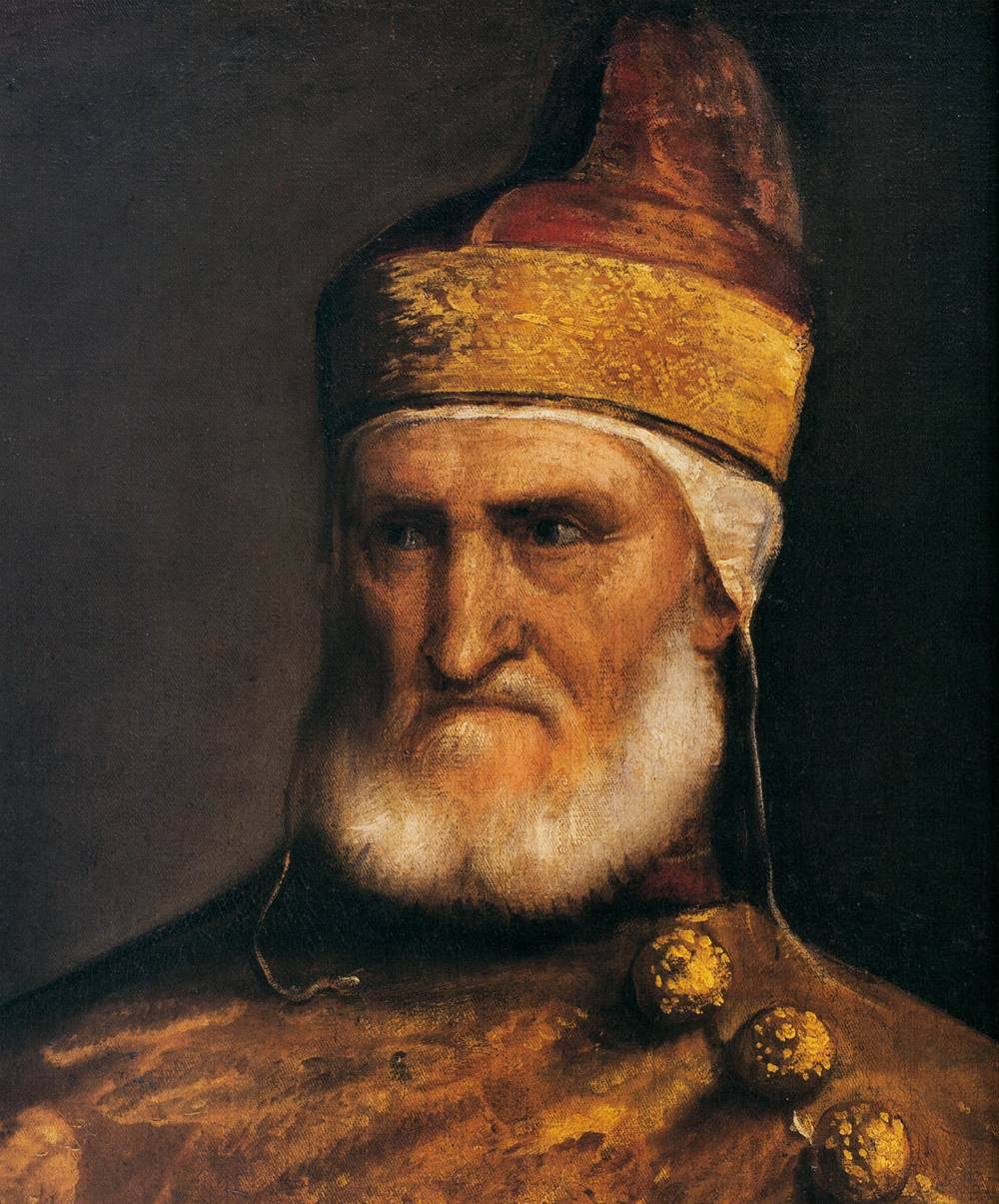
Doge Andrea Gritti (detail)

Among the portraits of Doge Andrea Gritti which Titian executed, this is the only one surviving of all the doges' portraits Titian must have painted in his capacity of official painter to the Republic. It may have served as a preliminary study for a State portrait, and was broadly sketched in and finished by Titian in a few sittings. According to Gronau, "It cannot fail to create a strong impression from the spontaneous freshness of its design and the truth to nature in its technique." The picture has been likened to Michelangelo's statue of Moses, a possible influence; both works imbue their subject with the quality of terribilità.

== Provenance ==
The picture was bought in 1626 in Italy for Charles I of England, hung at the Palace of Whitehall, London, and was sold at the Commonwealth sale at Somerset House, London, on 23 October 1651. It was owned by Wenzel Anton, Prince von Kaunitz-Rietburg, and passed by inheritance in 1794 to Wenzel Alois, Prinz Kaunitz. It was sold at the Kaunitz sale at Vienna on 13 March 1820 as lot 178, and purchased by Johann Rudolf, Count Czernin von Chudenitz, Vienna; passing by inheritance through the Czernin von Chudenitz family of Vienna, to Count Eugen Czernin von Chudenitz, Vienna, as of 1933, till at least 1948. It was sold in 1954 to the Samuel H. Kress Foundation, New York City, and gifted in 1961 to the National Gallery of Art in Washington D.C.

== Gallery ==
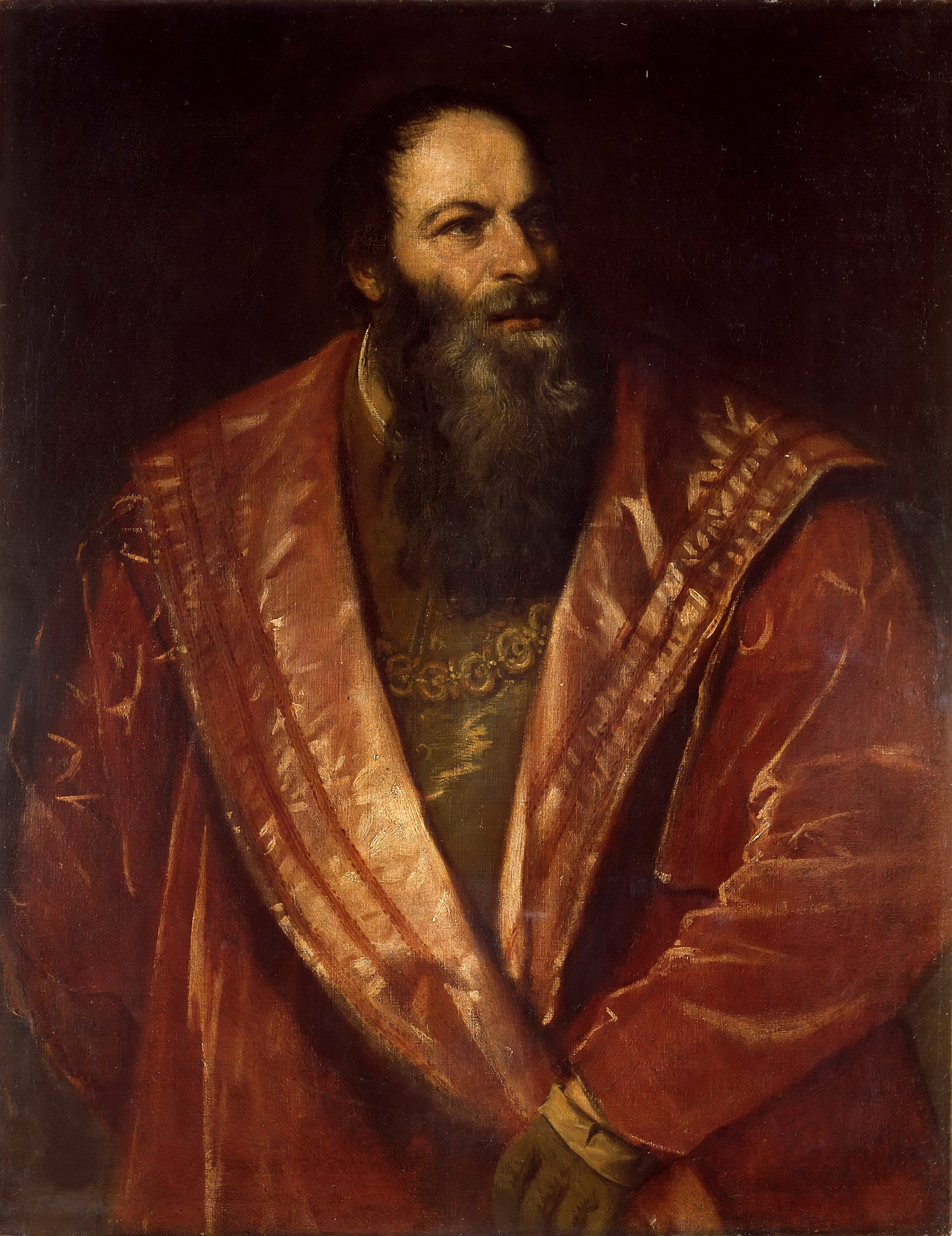
Titian: Portrait of Pietro Aretino, c. 1545

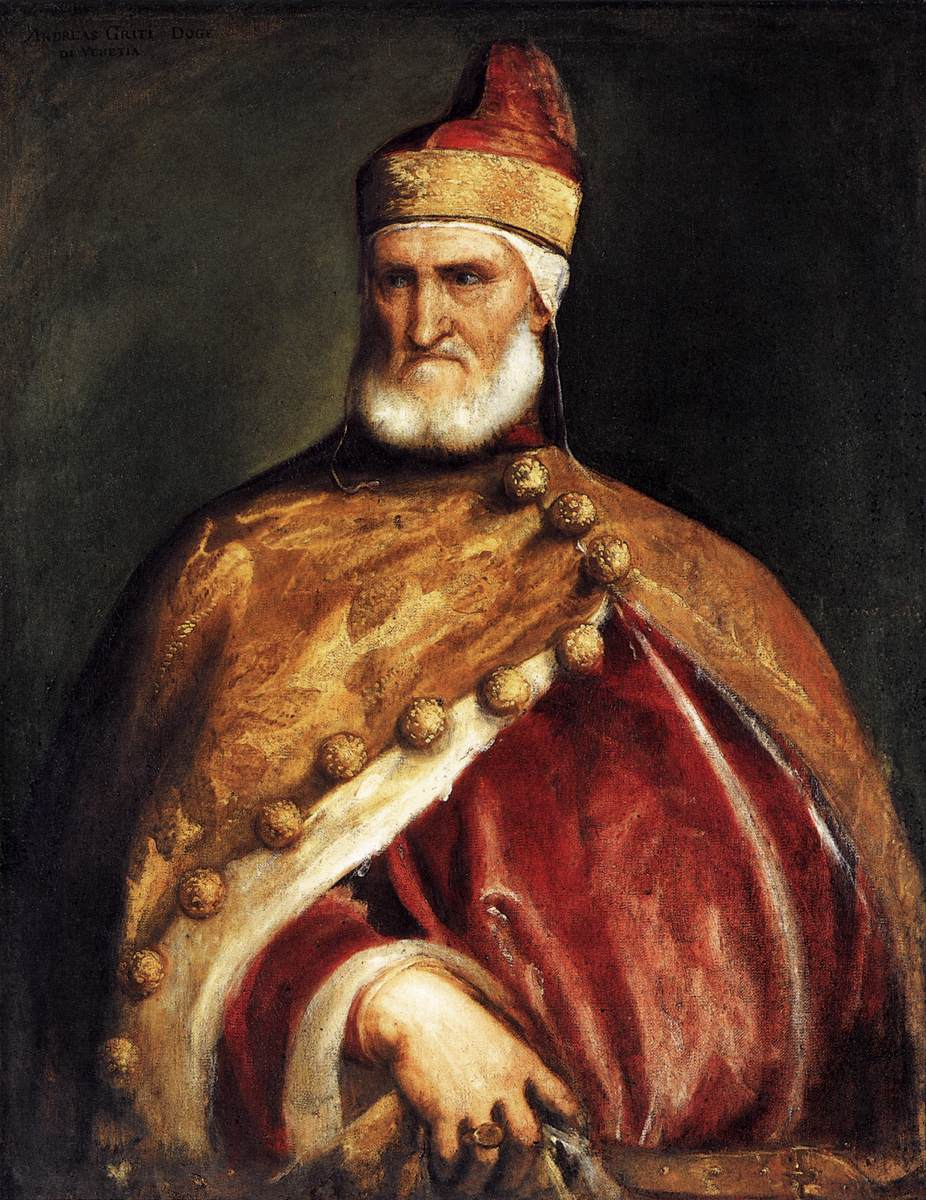
Titian: Portrait of Doge Andrea Gritti, c. 1546–1550

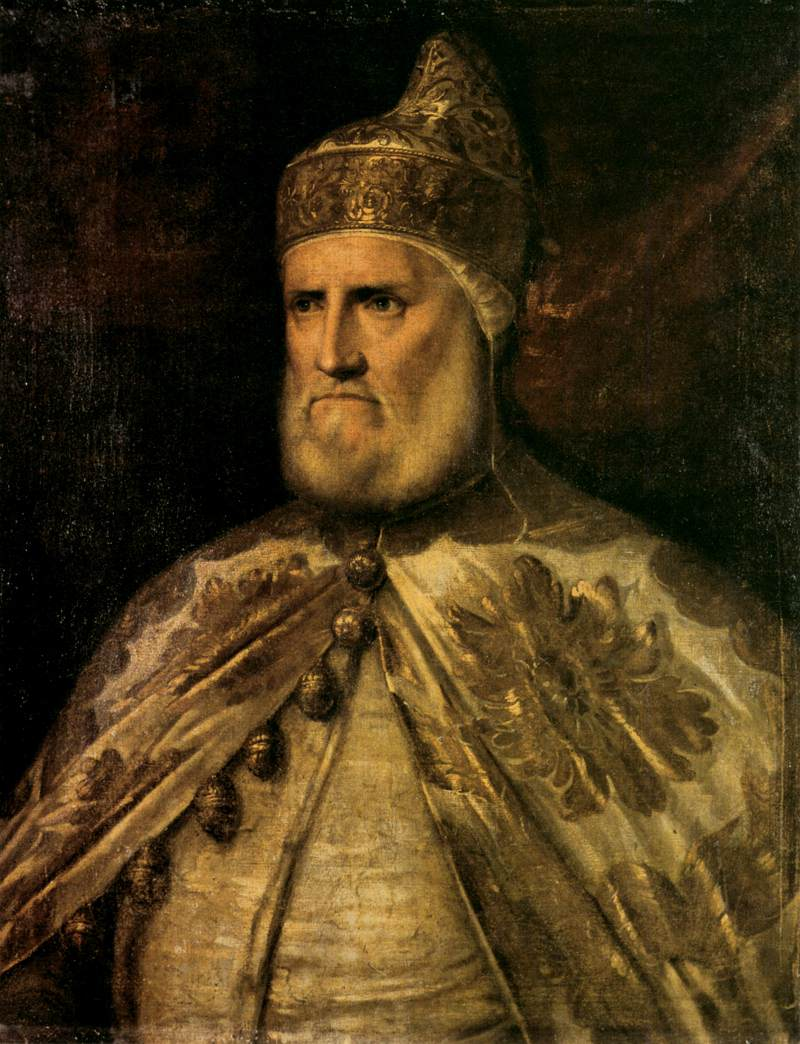
Titian: Doge Andrea Gritti, c. 1537–1540

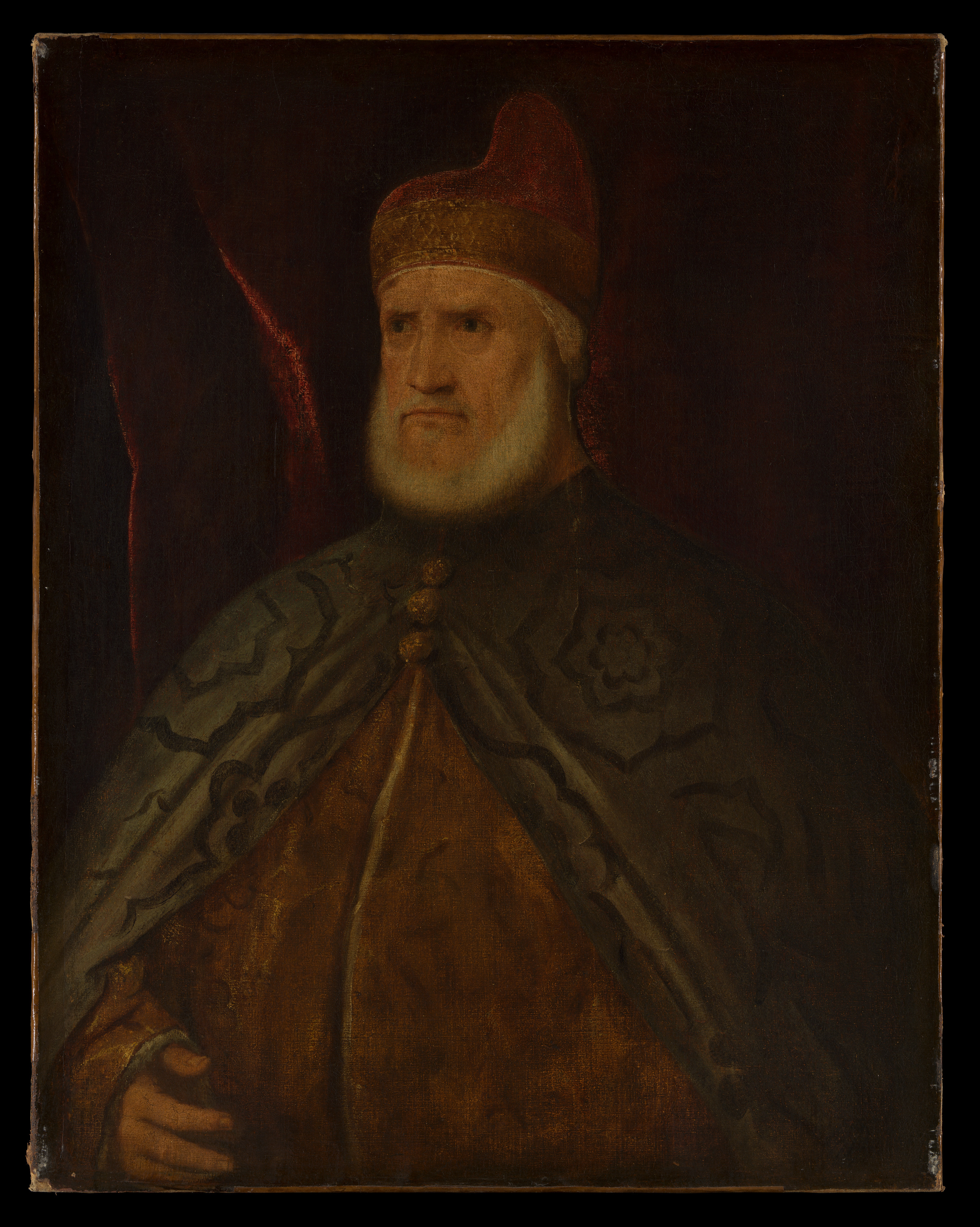
Workshop of Titian: Doge Andrea Gritti, 16th c.

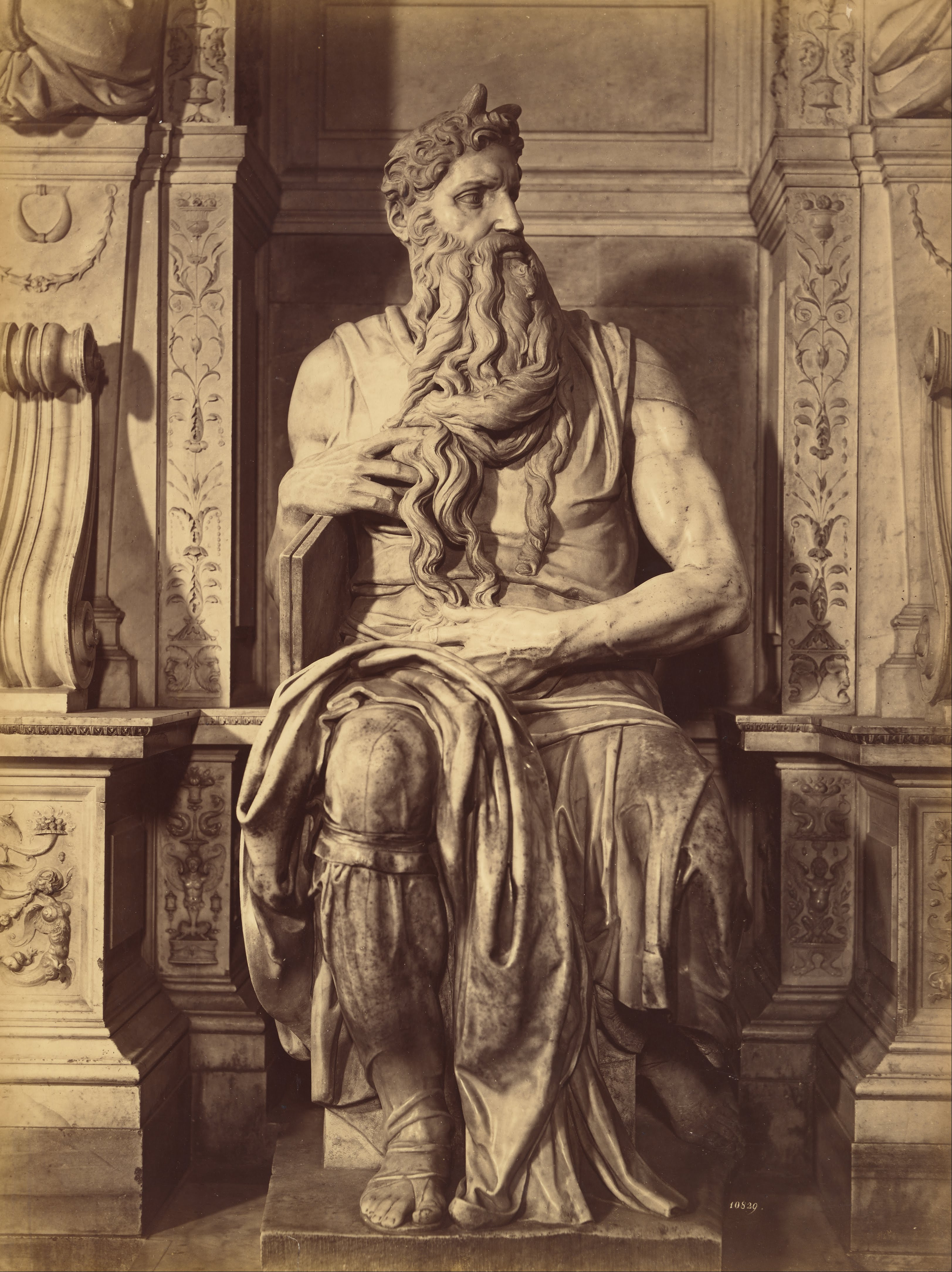
Michelangelo: Moses, c. 1513–1515

== See also ==
- List of works by Titian

== Sources ==
- Cole, Bruce (1999). Titian And Venetian Painting, 1450–1590. United States: Westview Press. pp. 133–138.
- Gronau, Georg (1904). Titian. London: Duckworth and Co; New York: Charles Scribner's Sons. pp. 73–74, 278.
- Humfrey, Peter (2019). "Titian / Doge Andrea Gritti, c. 1546/1550". NGA Online Editions. Retrieved 13 March 2023.
- Ricketts, Charles (1910). Titian. London: Methuen & Co. Ltd. pp. 176, plate lxxxiii.
