= Pietro Aretino =

Italian author and blackmailer (1492–1556)

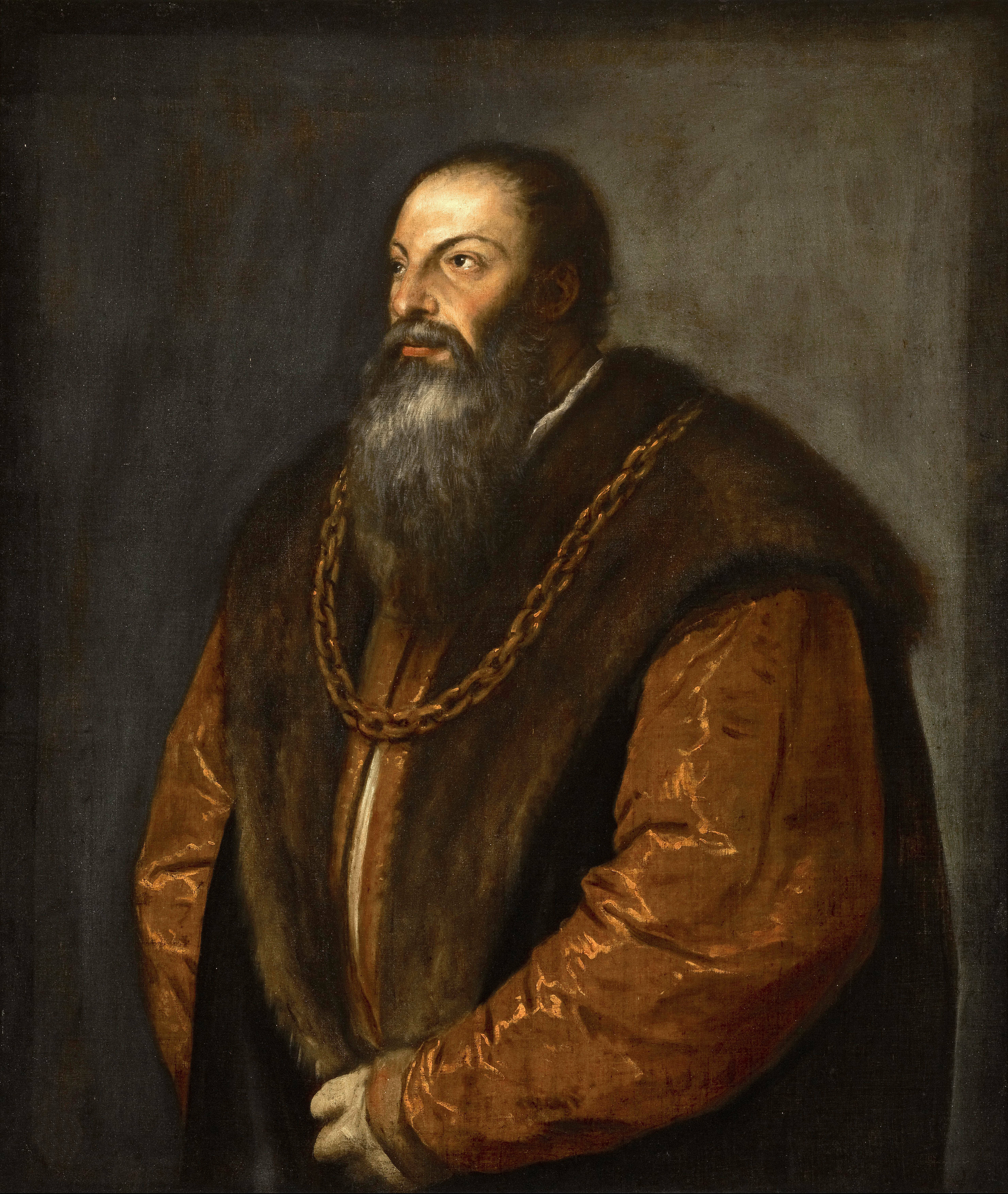
- Pietro Aretino, by Titian (Frick Collection)
- Born: 19 or 20 April 1492; Arezzo, Republic of Florence (present-day Tuscany, Italy)
- Died: 21 October 1556 (aged 64); Venice, Republic of Venice (present-day Veneto, Italy)
- Occupations: Author; playwright; poet; satirist

Pietro Aretino (US: /ˌɑːrɪˈtiːnoʊ, ˌær-/, Italian: [ˈpjɛːtro areˈtiːno]; 19 or 20 April 1492 – 21 October 1556) was an Italian author, playwright, poet, satirist and blackmailer, who wielded influence on contemporary art and politics. He was one of the most influential writers of his time and an outspoken critic of the powerful. He gained prominence through his politically charged writings and biting satire, which targeted powerful figures, including monarchs and popes. His works spanned various genres, including poetry, drama, and religious commentary, but he is particularly noted for his lampoons and erotic literature. Owing to his communications and sympathies with religious reformers, he is considered to have been a Nicodemite Protestant.

Aretino was a good friend and publicist of the Venetian artist Titian, who painted his portrait three times. Aretino is also remembered for an exchange of letters he had with Michelangelo concerning the latter's fresco The Last Judgment.

Aretino was a key figure in 16th-century Italian cultural and literary circles, earning both admiration and condemnation for his fearless critique of authority. His relationship with leading artists and his role as an adviser to rulers cemented his reputation as a formidable intellectual and social commentator.

== Life ==
His father was Luca Del Tura, a shoemaker from Arezzo, in Tuscany, Italy, who abandoned his family to join the militia. The father later returned to Arezzo, finally dying in poverty at the age of 85, unforgiven by his son, who never acknowledged the paternal name, taking Aretino (meaning 'Arretine, from Arezzo') as a surname.

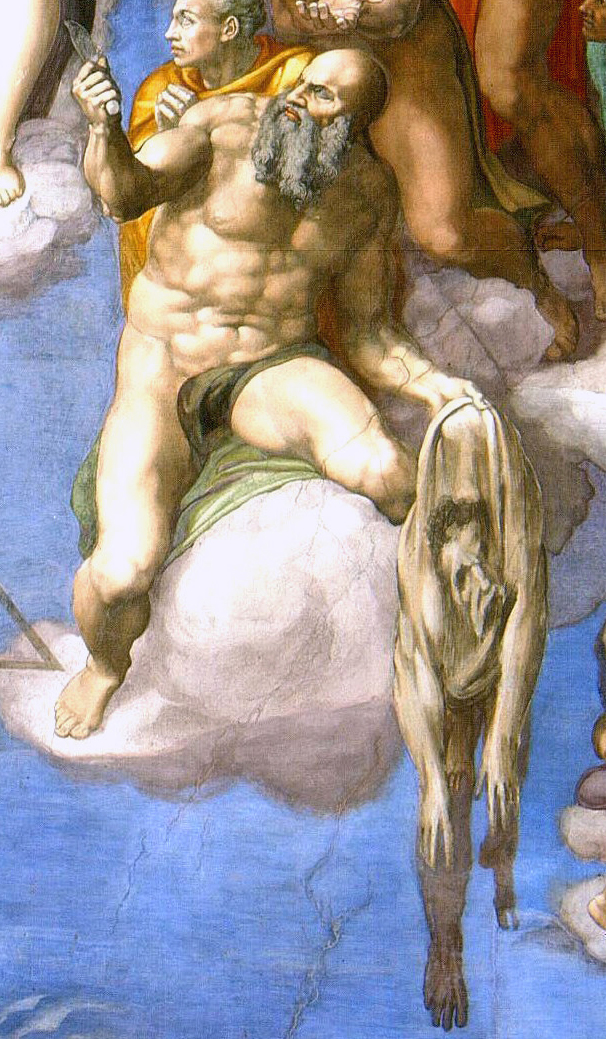
St Bartholomew (who resembles Aretino) displaying his flayed skin, in Michelangelo's The Last Judgment in the Sistine Chapel

His mother was Margherita, known as Tita, Bonci. Either before or after the abandonment (it is not known which), she entered into a lasting relationship with a local noble, Luigi Bacci, who supported Tita, Pietro and his two sisters and brought up Pietro as part of his own family.

Aretino spent a formative decade in Perugia, before being sent, highly recommended, to Rome. There Agostino Chigi, the rich banker and patron of Raphael, took him under his wing.

When Hanno the elephant, pet of Pope Leo X, died in 1516, Aretino penned a satirical pamphlet entitled "The Last Will and Testament of the Elephant Hanno". The fictitious will cleverly mocked the leading political and religious figures of Rome at the time, including Pope Leo X himself. The pamphlet was such a success that it started Aretino's career and established him as a famous satirist, ultimately known as "the Scourge of Princes".

Aretino prospered, living from hand to mouth as a hanger-on in the literate circle of his patron, sharpening his satirical talents on the gossip of politics and the Papal Curia, and turning the coarse Roman pasquinade into a rapier weapon of satire, until his sixteen ribald Sonetti Lussuriosi (Lust Sonnets) written to accompany Giulio Romano's exquisitely beautiful but utterly pornographic series of drawings engraved by Marcantonio Raimondi under the title I Modi finally caused such outrage that he had to temporarily flee Rome.

After Leo's death in 1521, his patron was Cardinal Giulio de' Medici, whose competitors for the papal throne felt the sting of Aretino's scurrilous lash. The installation of the Dutch pope Adrian VI ("la tedesca tigna" in Pietro's words) instead encouraged Aretino to seek new patrons away from Rome, mainly with Federico II Gonzaga in Mantua, and with the condottiero Giovanni de' Medici ("Giovanni delle Bande Nere"). The election of his old Medici patron as Pope Clement VII sent him briefly back to Rome, but death threats and an attempted assassination from one of the victims of his pen, Bishop Giovanni Giberti, in July 1525, set him wandering through northern Italy in the service of various noblemen, distinguished by his wit, audacity and brilliant and facile talents, until he settled permanently in 1527, in Venice, the anti-Papal city of Italy, "seat of all vices", Aretino noted with gusto.

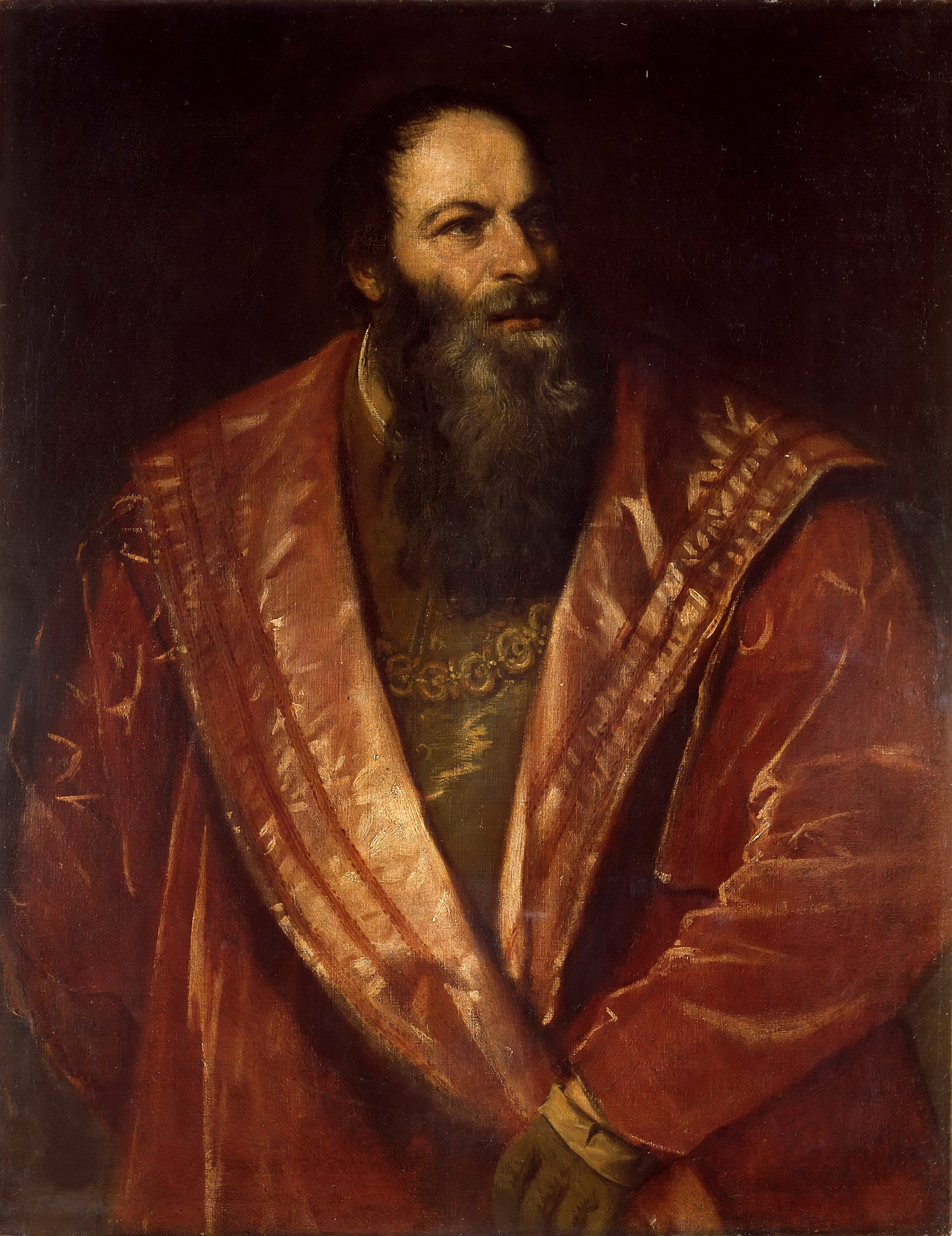
Portrait of Pietro Aretino, by Titian, 1545 (Palazzo Pitti)

He was a lover of men, having declared himself "a sodomite" since birth. In a letter to Giovanni de' Medici written in 1524 Aretino enclosed a satirical poem saying that due to a sudden aberration he had "fallen in love with a female cook and temporarily switched from boys to girls...." (My Dear Boy). In his comedy Il marescalco, the lead man is overjoyed to discover that the woman he has been forced to marry is really a page boy in disguise. While at court in Mantua he developed a crush on a young man called Bianchino, and annoyed Duke Federico with a request to plead with the boy on the writer's behalf.

Safe in Venice, Aretino became a blackmailer, extorting money from men who had sought his guidance in vice. He "kept all that was famous in Italy in a kind of state of siege", in Jacob Burckhardt's estimation. Francis I of France and Charles V pensioned him at the same time, each hoping for some damage to the reputation of the other. "The rest of his relations with the great is mere beggary and vulgar extortion", according to Burckhardt. Addison states that "he laid half Europe under contribution."

At one time, Aretino owned the painting by Parmigianino, Self-Portrait in a Convex Mirror.

Aretino is said to have died of suffocation from "laughing too much". The more likely truth may be that he died from a stroke or heart attack.

== Writings ==
His literary talent, his clear and sparkling style, his varied observation of men and things, would have made him a considerable writer under any circumstances, destitute as he was of the power of conceiving a genuine work of art, such as a true dramatic comedy; and to the coarsest as well as the most refined malice he added a grotesque wit so brilliant that in some cases it does not fall short of that of Rabelais.

— Jacob Burckhardt, The Civilization of the Renaissance in Italy, 1860.

Apart from both sacred and profane texts – a satire of high-flown Renaissance Neoplatonic dialogues is set in a brothel – and comedies such as La cortigiana and La talenta, Aretino is remembered above all for his letters, full of literary flattery that could turn to blackmail. They circulated widely in manuscript and he collected them and published them at intervals winning as many enemies as it did fame, and earned him the dangerous nickname Ariosto gave him: flagello dei principi ("scourge of princes"). In 1559, three years after Aretino's death, his entire oeuvre was listed in the papal Index of Prohibited Books.

La cortigiana is a parody of Castiglione's Il Cortegiano, and features the adventures of a Sienese gentleman, Messer Maco, who travels to Rome to become a cardinal. He would also like to win himself a mistress, but when he falls in love with a girl he sees in a window, he realizes that only as a courtier would he be able to win her. In mockery of Castiglione's advice on how to become the perfect courtier, a charlatan proceeds to teach Messer Maco how to behave as a courtier: he must learn how to deceive and flatter, and sit hours in front of the mirror.

== Portrayals by artists ==
Aretino was a close friend of Titian's, who painted his portrait three times: a 1527 portrait in the Kunstmuseum Basel, a 1537 portrait in the Frick Collection, and a 1545 portrait in the Pitti Palace. Luba Freedman cites a fourth portrait, from "not later than 1535", but Xavier F. Salomon, director of the Calouste Gulbenkian Museum in Lisbon, Portugal, writes that "there is no evidence that it ever existed". Titian also portrayed Aretino as Pontius Pilate in his painting "Ecce Homo", in the Kunsthistorisches Museum, Vienna, "as a nameless soldier in the crowd" in "Alfonso d'Avalos Addressing his Troops", in the Prado Museum, Madrid, and next to a self-portrait in "La Gloria", also in the Prado.

Clement VII made Aretino a Knight of Rhodes, and Julius III named him a Knight of St. Peter, but the chain he wears for his 1545 portrait may have merely been jewelry. Fabian Alfie, however, writes that the "chain was a gift from King Francis I of France." In his strictly-for-publication letters to patrons Aretino would often add a verbal portrait to Titian's painted one.

Many critics of Titian, "particularly in the nineteenth century, ... could not grasp why a giant of the artistic world might rub shoulders with a writer whom they characterized primarily as a 'pornographer.' In recent decades, literary critics have reassessed Aretino as an important author of the age, and it is increasingly clear that the lives of the two men paralleled one another to a degree."

Titian was far from the only artist who portrayed Aretino. "Probably no other celebrity of the cinquecento had his image reproduced so often and in so many media: paintings, frescoes, sculptures, prints, medals.... At various stages of his life Aretino was also portrayed by Sebastiano del Piombo, Alessandro Moretto, Francesco Salviati, Jacopo Tintoretto, and Giorgio Vasari. His portrait was engraved by Marcantonio Raimondi and Giovanni Jacopo Caraglio. His likeness was reproduced on medals by Leone Leoni, Francesco Segala, Alfonso Lombardi, and Alessandro Vittoria and his image was sculpted by Jacopo Sansovino and Danese Cattaneo."

== The Last Judgment ==
In November 1545, Aretino wrote an open letter to Michelangelo criticizing the nudity in The Last Judgment, Michelangelo's fresco in the Sistine Chapel in Rome. His dialogues, La Nanna, Aretino wrote, "demonstrate the superiority of my reserve to your indiscretion, seeing that I, while handling themes lascivious and immodest, use language comely and decorous, speak in terms beyond reproach and inoffensive to chaste ears. You, on the contrary, presenting so awful a subject, exhibit saints and angels, these without earthly decency, and those without celestial honors.... Your art would be at home in some voluptuous bagnio, certainly not in the highest chapel in the world.... I do not write this out of any resentment for the things I begged of you. In truth, if you had sent me what you promised, you would only have been doing what you ought to have desired most eagerly to do in your own interest." John Addington Symonds writes, "Aretino’s real object was to wheedle some priceless sketch or drawing out of the great master. This appears from a second letter written by him on the 20th of January 1538."

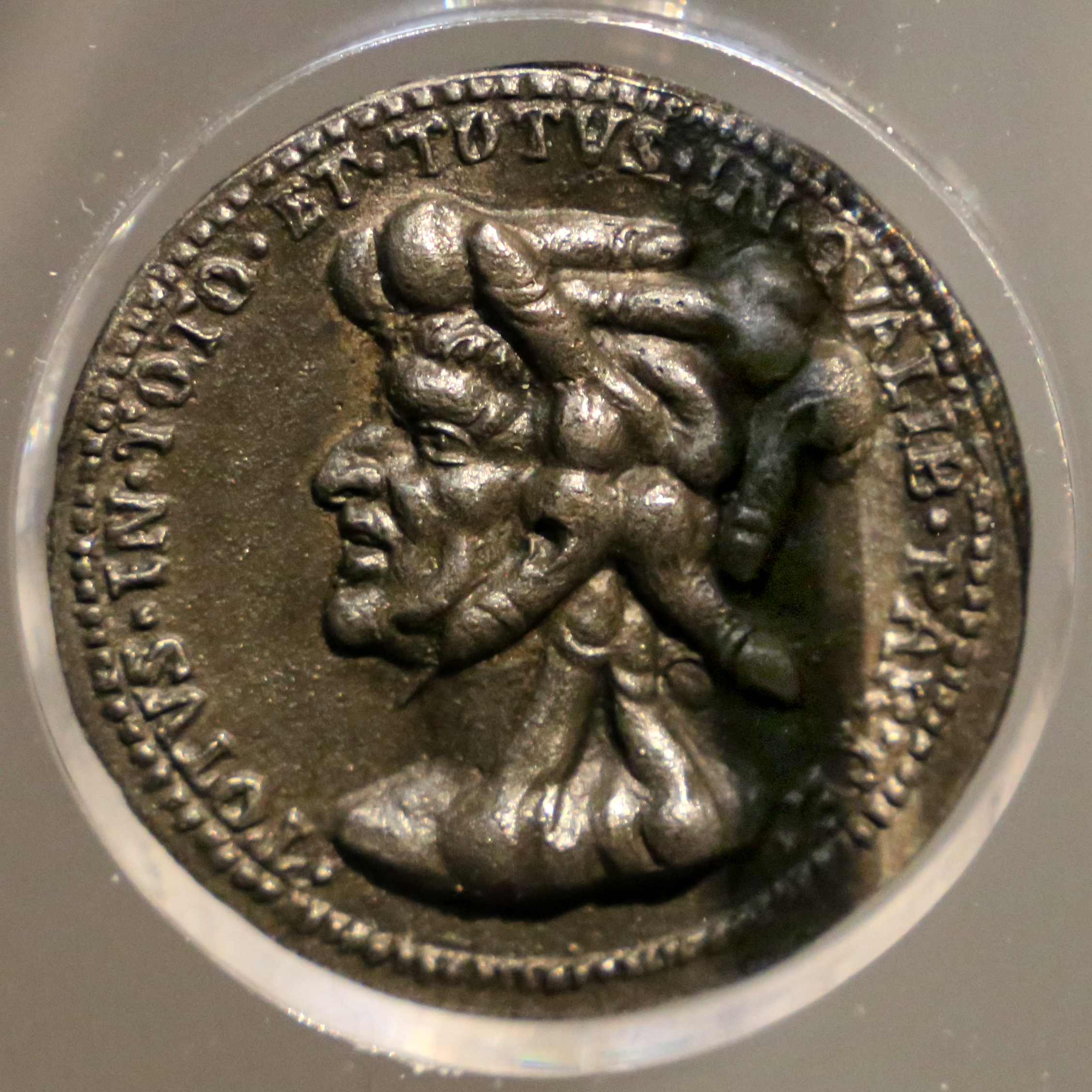
Anonymous joke medal of Aretino with phalluses, before 1575

Symonds describes Michelangelo's answer to Aretino's November 1545 letter: "Under the form of elaborate compliment it conceals the scorn he must have conceived for Aretino and his insolent advice. Yet he knew how dangerous the man could be, and felt obliged to humour him." James Connor notes that, in Michelangelo's The Last Judgment, completed in 1541, he had painted Saint Bartholomew displaying his own flayed skin: "[T]he sagging flayed skin ... many scholars believe depicts Michelangelo's own features. Interestingly, the face of Saint Bartholomew [who is holding the skin] is similar to the face of Pietro Aretino, one of Michelangelo's chief persecutors." But these resemblances were unrelated to Aretino's letter to Michelangelo. Bernadine Barnes writes that no sixteenth-century critic noticed "the portrait of Pietro Aretino in the fresco.... [V]iewers of our own time have often seen him as St Bartholomew, who brandishes a knife in one hand and holds the skin with the semblance of Michelangelo's face in the other. However, Aretino's criticism [of Michelangelo] was not written until 1545, four years after the fresco was completed. Even Aretino's good friend Vasari did not recognize him."

Journalist Tim Brinkhof writes, "Aretino, insulted when Michelangelo ignored his advice on how to organize the fresco, suggested 'making a bonfire' with the artist’s work as firewood.... Michaelangelo retaliated" by transforming Aretino into Saint Bartholomew.

== Legacy ==
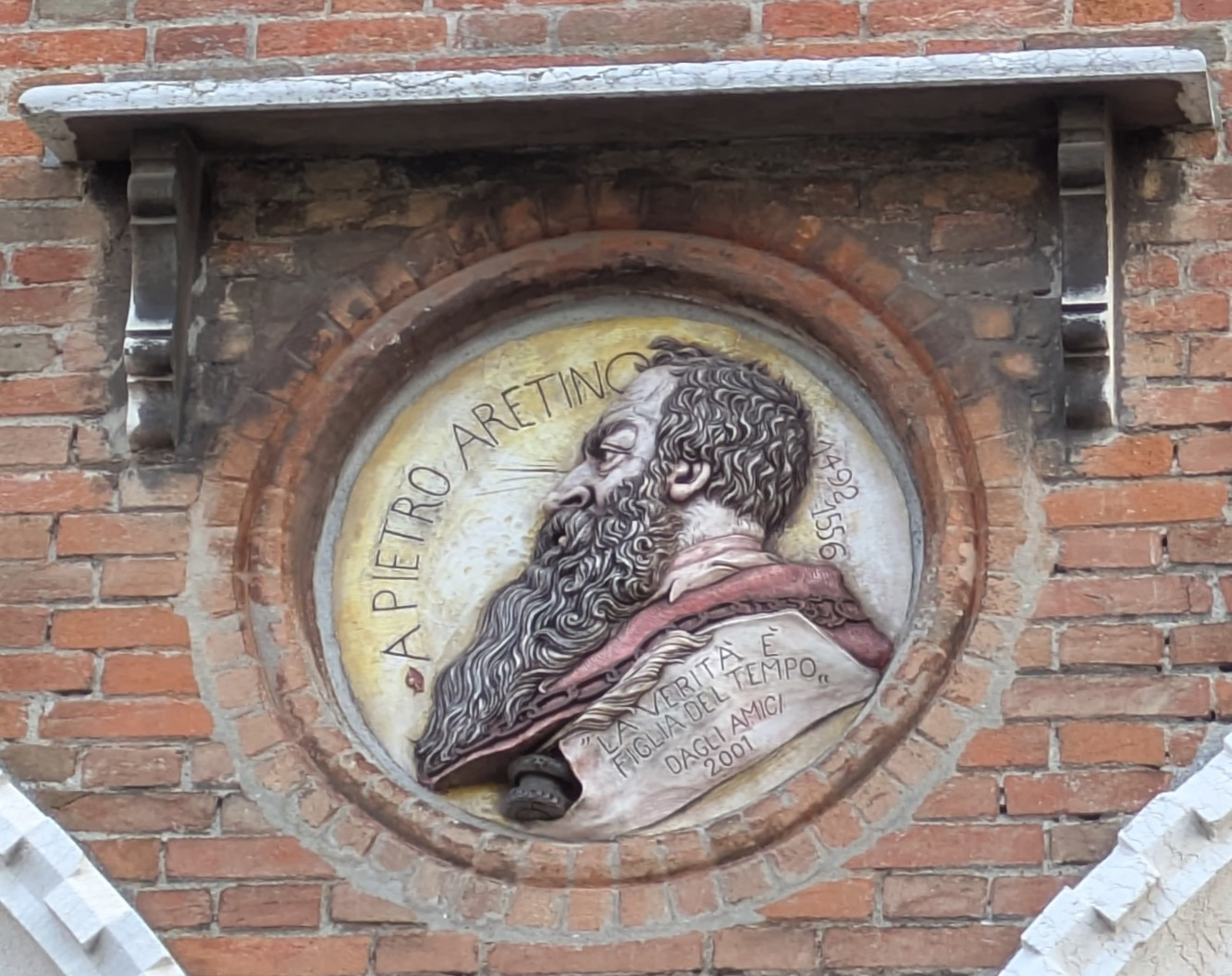
A 2001 sculpture of Aretino on the Pescheria di Rialto (fish market) in Venice, near where Aretino lived. The inscription reads: "Truth is the daughter of time."

Aretino is frequently mentioned in English works of the Elizabethan and later periods and differently appreciated, in comments ranging from "It was one of the wittiest knaves that ever God made" of Nashe (The Unfortunate Traveller) to "that notorious ribald of Arezzo" of Milton's Areopagitica. Samuel Pepys alludes to Aretino's erotic poetry in his diary entry of 15 May 1663 in reference to King Charles II's mistress Lady Castlemaine:

that the King do mind nothing but pleasures, and hates the very sight or thoughts of business; that my Lady Castlemaine rules him, who, he says, hath all the tricks of Aretin that are to be practised to give pleasure.

The English traveller Sir John Reresby visited "the obscene profane poet" Aretino's grave in the church of San Luca, Venice, in the mid-1650s. He relates that the following epitaph had been removed by the inquisitors: Qui jace Aretin, poeta Tusco, qui dice mal d'ogni uno fuora di Dio; scusandosi dicendo, Io no'l cognosco. This he translates as "Here Aretin, the Tuscan poet, lies, who all the world abused but God, and why? he said he knew him not." Another source states, "At the end of the 1800s, during the reconstruction works of the floor of the church, this plaque disappeared". Yet another source states, "His tomb in San Luca no longer exists".

Pietro's first biographer states that there was no epitaph on the tomb. Those who claim that there was a sarcastic epitaph in hendecasyllables a maiore suspect that it should be attributed to Bishop Paolo Giovio, and that it was composed when Aretino was still alive:

Qui giace l'Aretin, poeta tosco:
Di tutti disse mal fuorché di Cristo,
Scusandosi col dir: non lo conosco.

In 2007, the composer Michael Nyman set some of Aretino's Sonetti lussuriosi to music under the title 8 Lust Songs. Once again, Aretino's texts proved controversial: at a 2008 performance at Cadogan Hall, London, the printed programs were withdrawn following allegations of obscenity.

== Works ==
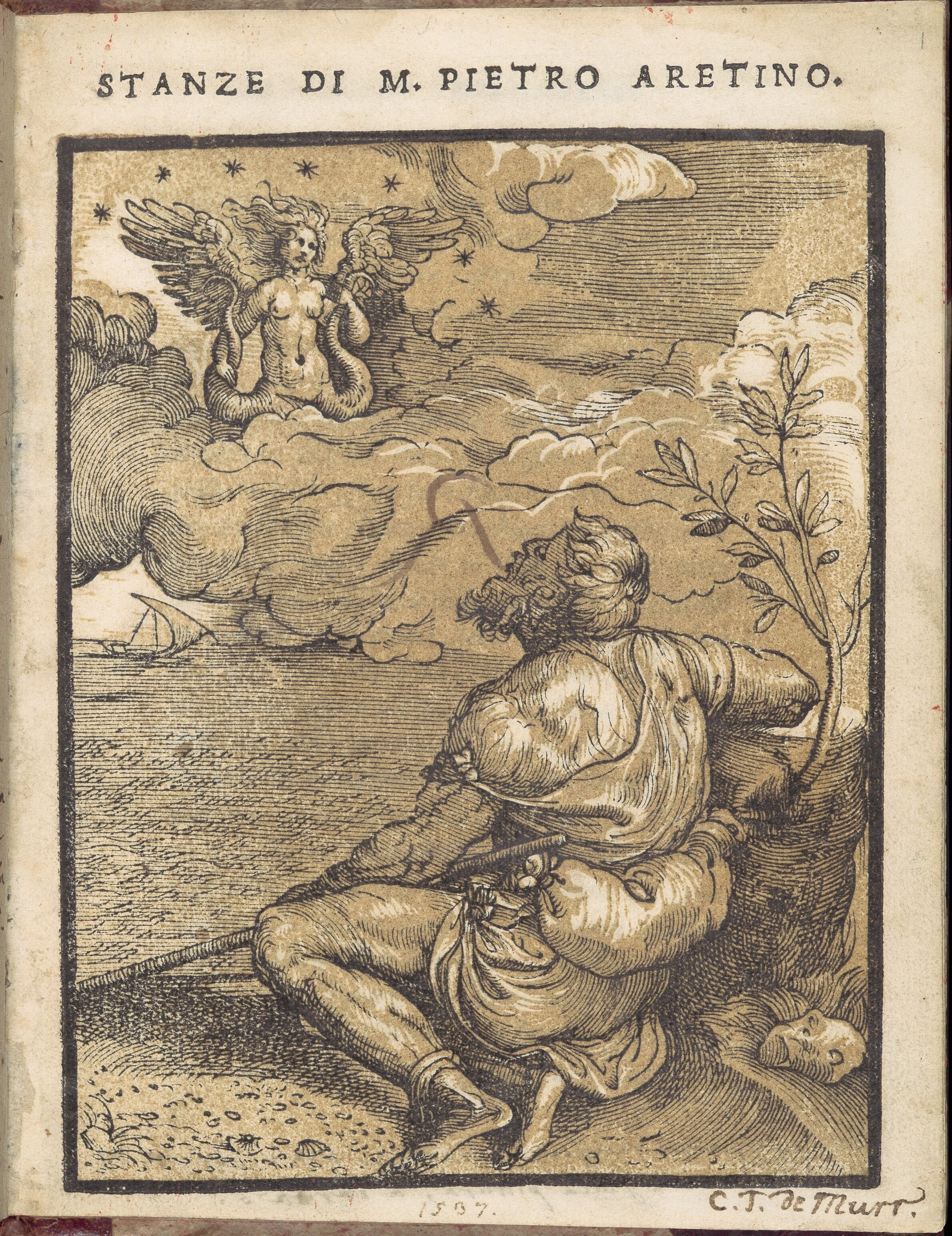
Stanze di Pietro Aretino, woodcut by Giovanni Britto, 1537

=== Poetry ===
- Sonetti lussuriosi (1526). Erotically explicit sonnets written to accompany Marcantonio Raimondi's engravings of Giulio Romano's drawings of sexual positions in I Modi.
- Dubbi amorosi (1526). A series of questions and answers on erotic matters, expressed as poems in ottava rima and quatrains.
- Marfisa (1527–; published 1532, 1535)
- Angelica (published 1536)
- Orlandino (published 1540)
- Astolfeida (published c. 1547)

=== Prose ===
- Lettere
- Ragionamenti (also called Sei Giornate) (1534, 1536). A pair of Renaissance dialogues. In the Dialogue of Nanna and Antonia under a Fig Tree in Rome (1534), the two women discuss the life options open to Nanna's daughter, Pippa, to become a nun, a wife or a whore. In the follow-up Dialogue in which Nanna Teaches her Daughter Pippa (1536), the relations between prostitutes and their clients are discussed. Translated by Raymond Rosenthal as Aretino's Dialogues (New York: Stein and Day, 1972).
- The second dialogue was also translated by Rosa Maria Falvo, Alessandro Gallenzi, and Rebecca Skipwith as The School of Whoredom (London: Hesperus Press Limited, 2003). Hesperus published sequels to this titled The Secret Life of Nuns (2004) and The Secret Life of Wives (2005).

=== Plays ===
- Farza
- La cortigiana (1525, 1534). Comedy in five acts, a parody of the then-unpublished Il cortegiano by Baldassare Castiglione. First performance possibly in Carnival 1525. A revised version was published in Venice in 1534.
- Il marescalco (1533). Comedy in five acts. The play served as a source for Malipiero's opera of the same name (Treviso, 1969).
- La talanta (1542). Comedy in five acts.
- Lo ipocrito (1542). Comedy in five acts.
- Il filosofo (1546). Comedy in five acts.
- L'Orazia (1546). Tragedy in verse.

== Sources ==
- Encyclopædia Britannica
