= Ecce Homo (Titian, Vienna) =

1543 painting by Titian

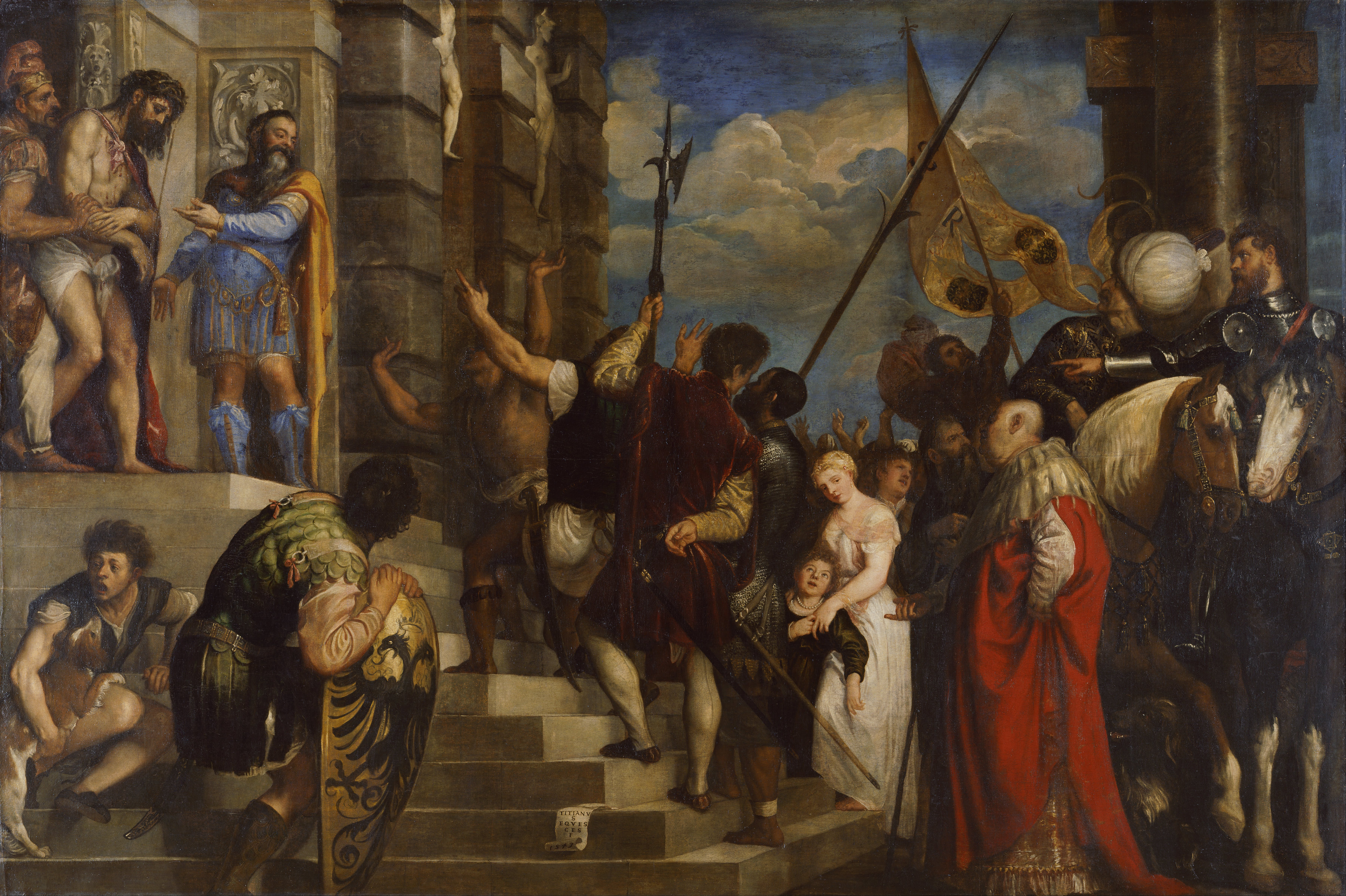
- Artist: Titian
- Year: 1543
- Medium: Oil on canvas
- Dimensions: 242 cm × 361 cm (95 in × 142 in)
- Location: Kunsthistorisches Museum; Vienna
- Accession: GG_73

The Ecce Homo (lit. 'Behold the Man') is a large oil on canvas painting by Titian, signed and dated 1543. It hangs in the Kunsthistorisches Museum, in Vienna. It is not to be confused with several smaller compositions by the same artist, including Christ Carrying the Cross, attributed to either Titian or Giorgione.

== Provenance ==
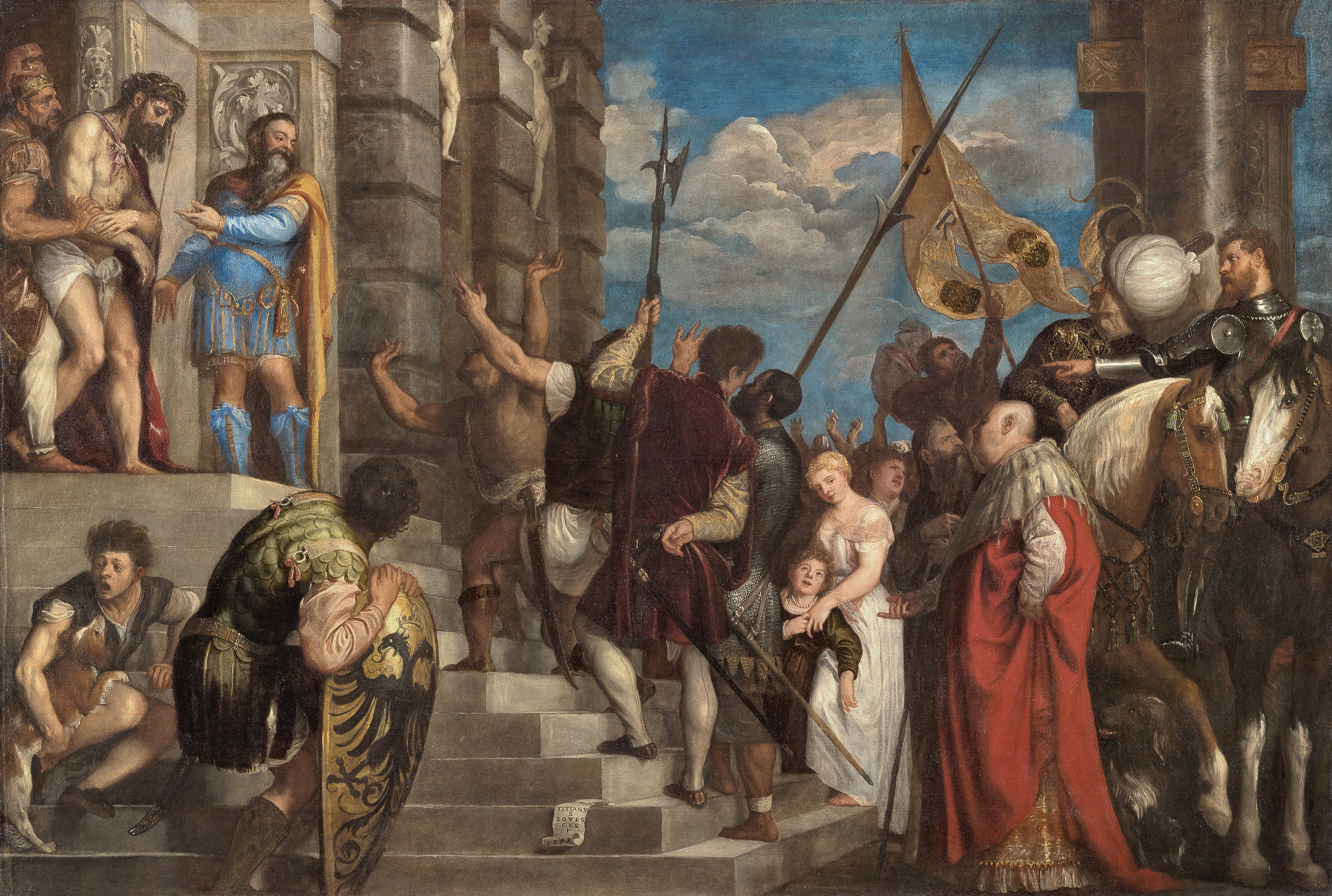
Titian: Ecce Homo, 1543

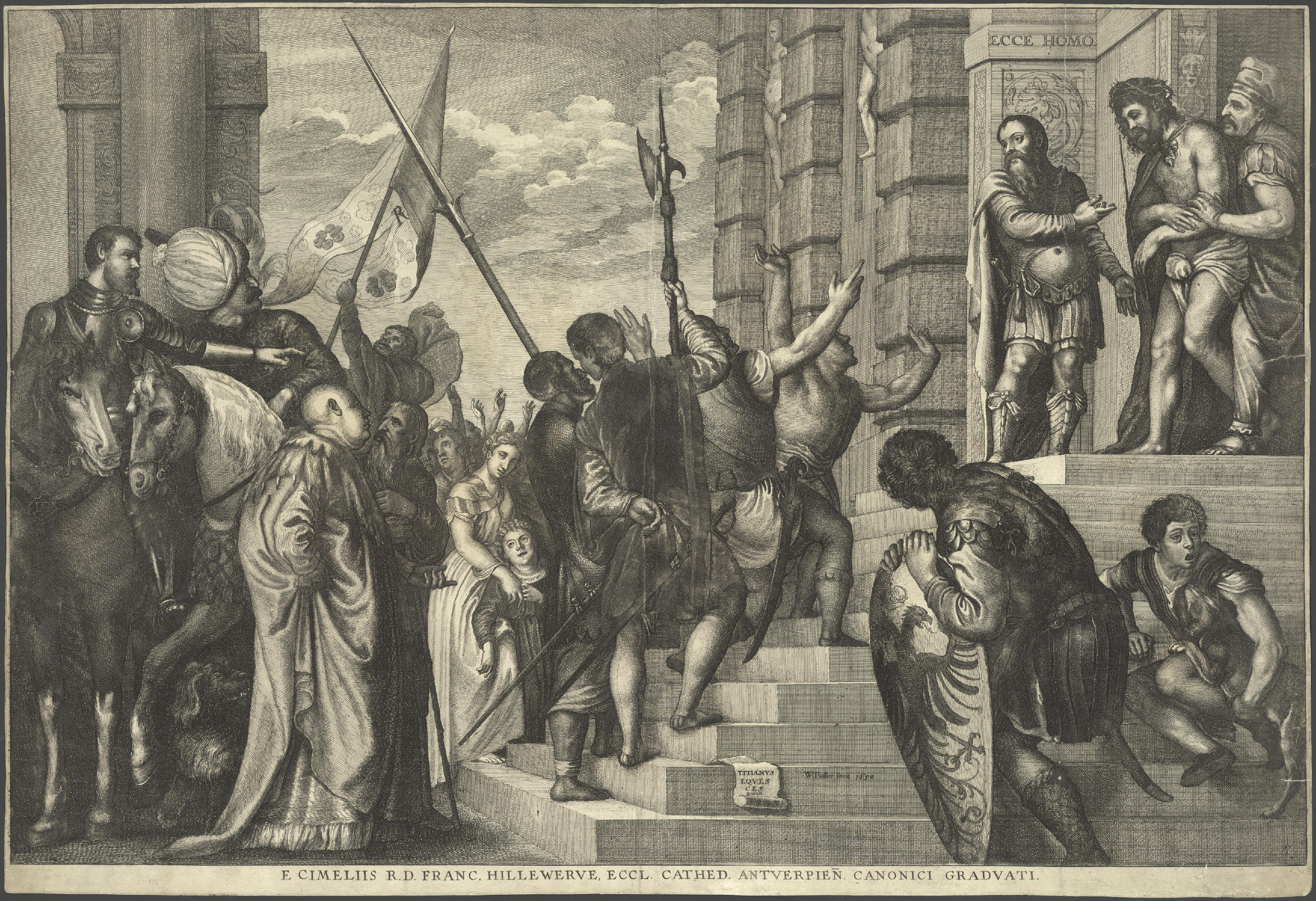
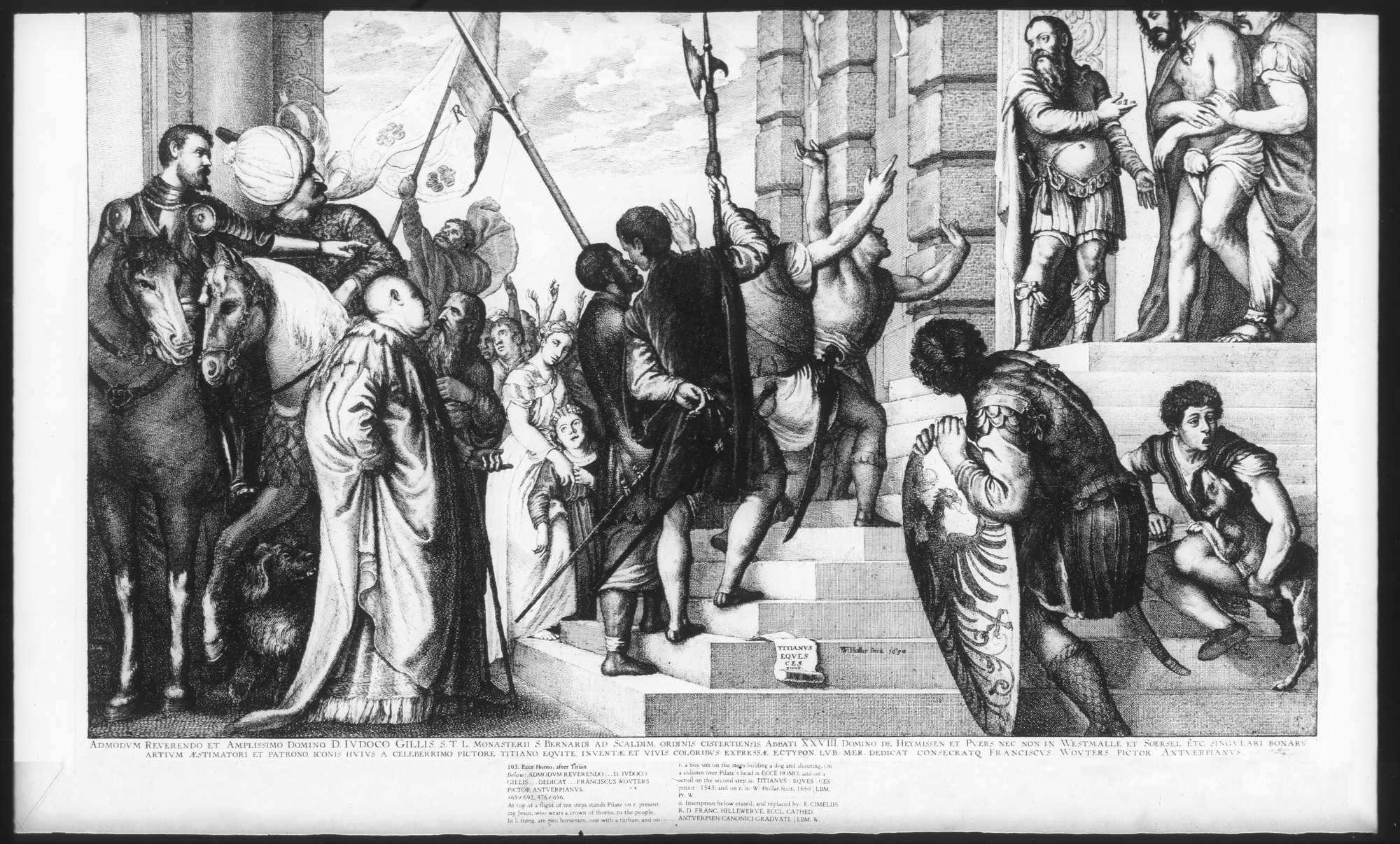
Wenceslaus Hollar, after Titian: Ecce Homo, 1650 (453 x 681 mm)

The Ecce Homo Titian finished in the year 1543 for Giovanni d'Anna, a rich Dutch or Flemish merchant settled in Venice, whom Vasari calls "Titian's compare"('gossip'). It was still in the possession of the merchant family in 1580. It was rumoured that King Henry III of France had in vain offered to Paolo d'Anna the sum of 800 ducats for the famous Ecce Homo in 1574. It was purchased by Sir Henry Wotton in the early seventeenth century to pass into the hands of the Duke of Buckingham in 1621, who refused £7,000 for it, offered by the Earl of Arundel. The picture left England under the Commonwealth. It was auctioned at Antwerp in 1648, and later acquired by Archduke Leopold Wilhelm for his brother Emperor Ferdinand III in Prague. Mentioned various times as preserved in Prague, it was transferred to Vienna in 1723.

== Description ==
At the top of the stairs leading to the palace, Jesus is standing, bared to the waist, an exhausted and powerless sufferer. He is being shown to the populace by Pontius Pilate, who is dressed in a blue Roman costume. As he questions the crowd who have assembled at the foot of the steps—a throng of warriors, in the middle of whom is a young blonde girl in white with her arm round a boy whom she draws towards her, in front a fat pharisee, on the right a few horsemen, a turbaned Oriental, each figure with its strongly marked type—the answer is thundered back to him, "Crucify Him!" They press half up the steps, they gesticulate and point at Jesus, they fling up their arms.

== Analysis ==
According to Walter Gronau, the likeness of Pilate, "whose face betrays a ghastly mixture of haughtiness and cynicism", is taken from Titian's friend Pietro Aretino. Almost in the centre of the composition stands the form of the light-haired girl in a soft white satin dress; legend has identified her as Titian's daughter Lavinia. Charles Ricketts thinks the fat patrician or pharisee in his ermine-lined robe reminiscent of the Emperor Vitellius.

== See also ==
- List of works by Titian

== Sources ==
- Prohaska, Wolfgang (1997). Kunsthistorisches Museum Vienna: The Paintings. London: Philip Wilson Publishers Limited. p. 27.
- "Ecce Homo". Kunsthistorisches Museum Wien, Bilddatenbank. Retrieved 18 October 2022.

Attribution:

- Gronau, Georg (1904). Titian. London: Duckworth and Co; New York: Charles Scribner's Sons. pp. 117–119, 192, 276.
- Ricketts, Charles (1910). Titian. London: Methuen & Co. Ltd. pp. 102–106, 133, 175.
