= Alvise Gritti =

Venetian politician

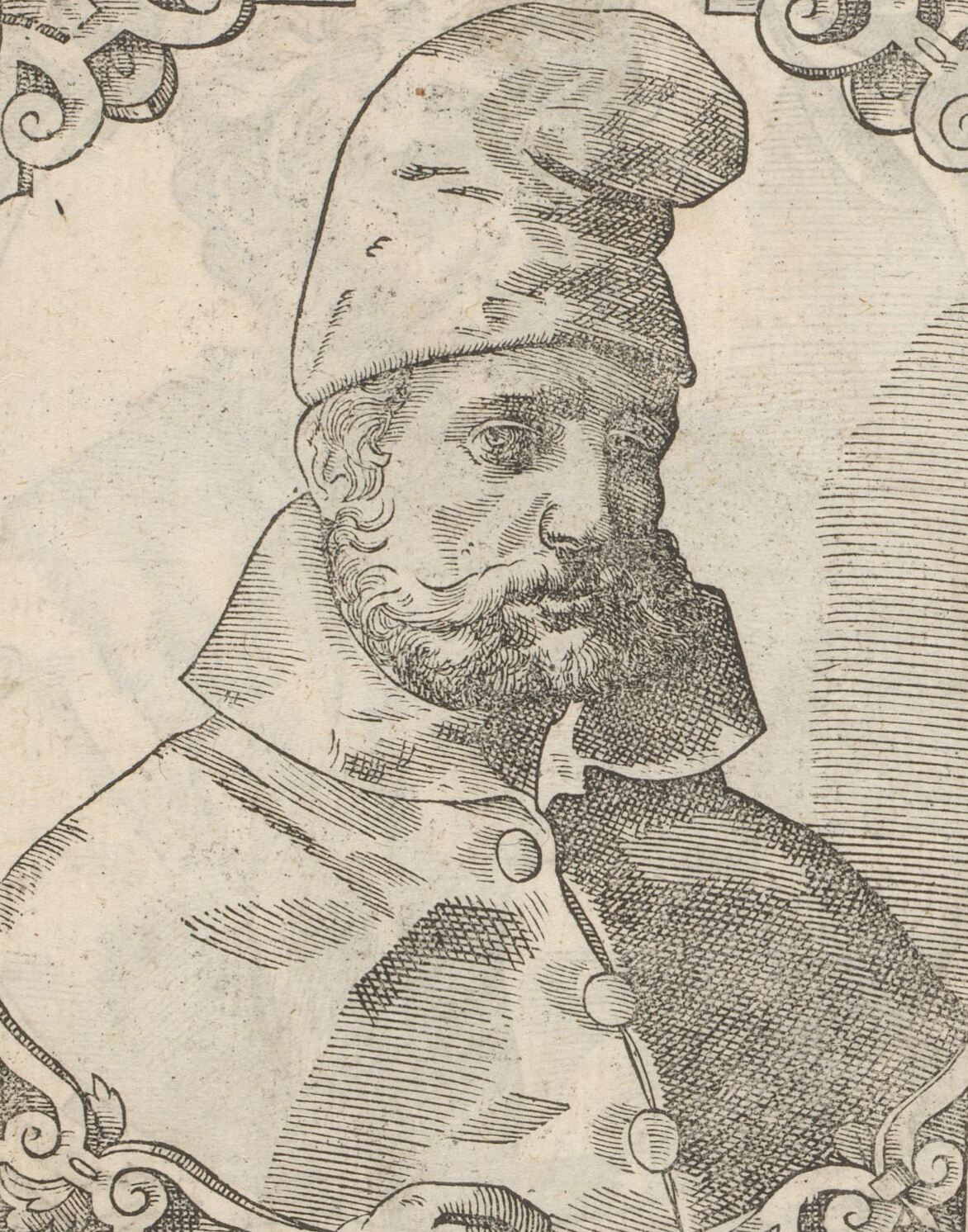
Engraved portrait of Alvise Gritti by Tobias Stimmer

Alvise Gritti (also Ludovico or Lodovico Gritti, born 29 September 1480, died 1534, Hungarian: Gritti Alajos) was a Venetian politician. He was influential in the Hungarian Kingdom under the reign of King John I of Hungary. He was also a minister of the Ottoman sultan, and regent of Hungary from 1530 to 1534. He was the natural son of Andrea Gritti, the Venetian Bailo of Constantinople during the reign of Sultan Bayezid II, who later became the Doge of Venice in 1523.

== Youth ==
Gritti’s father, Andrea, lived in Constantinople as a grain merchant for about twenty years before returning as a diplomat on behalf of Venice. Alvise was one of multiple sons Andrea had with a Greek mistress during this time. The commonly cited number of sons is four, Pietro, Alvise, Lorenzo, and Zorzi; however, Eric Dursteler mentions only three, citing one of Gritti's father's political opponents who argued that "one who has three bastard sons in Turkey [i.e. Ottoman Empire] should not be made Doge." Given that names exist for four sons, it seems more likely that this piece of political invective left out a son than that historians have added a fourth. Regardless, Gritti spent his childhood in Istanbul. He studied at the University of Padua, likely after traveling from Istanbul with his father in 1502. As an illegitimate child, Gritti was unable to hold high-ranking positions in Venice, but this barrier did not exist in Constantinople, to which he returned in 1506.

== Early career ==
Stationing himself in Galata, across the Golden Horn from Constantinople, Gritti became involved in banking and trade, particularly with Venice. Though trading in a variety of goods, such as saltpeter, salt milk, clothes, saffron, tin, and wine, grain and gems were some of Gritti’s most prominent ventures. The former was imported to Venice, while the latter found a patron in the sultan. Gritti was thus involved in the creation and presentation of Süleyman the Magnificent's Venetian Helmet. His success was evidenced by his luxurious palazzo, with expansive gardens, stables, and numerous servants, stables, as well as by extravagant garments and jewelry. His court was host to feasts and entertainments, as well as Italian merchants and humanists.

The origins of Gritti’s relationship with Pargalı Ibrahim Pasha, who was appointed Grand Vizier to Suleiman in 1523, are unclear, but Gritti won favor with Ibrahim, who entrusted him with great responsibilities, making him a business partner. It is possible that Ibrahim Pasha was influenced by his childhood ties to Venice, as he was born on the Venetian island of Parga. Regardless, Ibrahim Pasha seems to have sought Gritti’s opinion on matters pertaining to foreign policy and he and the sultan are known to have visited Gritti’s house in Galata. Also in 1523 Gritti’s father ascended to the position of doge of Venice, a move that furthered Gritti’s political power. Gritti was known as the “Prince’s Son” and was likely partially responsible for Ibrahim Pasha’s favorable policies towards Venice.

Gritti never converted to Islam, and kept his faith to Christianity along with his Christian name, despite the usual necessity of doing so to gain high-ranking positions within the Ottoman government. Instead, he used his wealth to greatly bolster his political power, including by giving frequent loans to many government officials. Since he was born into a power family with his father as the Doge of Venice, he was also already well-acquainted with this level of society, and had many strong political connections throughout Europe. These made him particularly useful as an expert on European affairs to the Ottomans, and subsequently in working in diplomacy for them.

In 1527 Gritti supported King John I of Hungary against Ferdinand I of Habsburg, who wanted the crown for himself. He soon became one of the most important allies of King John and served as ambassador between the monarch and the Turkish sultan. In 1528 the grand vizier, according to reports, planned to take him on the projected campaign into Hungary where Gritti was to get "an important archbishopric plus a piece of the archduchy of Austria once the Turks had taken them." Lodovico stayed in the city of Buda first as King John's advisor, and then between 1530 and 1534 as regent of Hungary.

== Governor of Hungary ==
In 1529, Gritti began receiving promotions for his role in Hungary under the Sultan. At first, he became the great treasurer and a Bishop of Erlau. Afterwards, in 1530, Gritti defended John Zápolya's rule over Hungary from an unexpected siege on Buda by Ferdinand I's forces while Gritti was supposed to be attending a peace conference regarding the status of Hungary in this imperial conflict. In exchange for the support of Gritti and the Ottomans, Zápolya gave Gritti the title of Governor of Hungary and Gritti handed down the role of bishop of Erlau to his son, Antonio. However, anonymous letters to Ferdinand I in 1528 and 1529 indicated that this decision had already been made at the time of their writing. In this instance, it was indicated that Ottoman Grand Vizier Ibrahim Pasha, who owed a significant debt to Gritti, made an agreement with Gritti and the Sultan to have Gritti become Governor. Therefore, Ibrahim Pasha had this deal confirmed in negotiations with Zápolya, and in return, the Hungarians would not have to pay kharaj to the Sultan for their alliance. Upon his official appointment to the role, however, the lesser nobility saw this unfavorably, as they feared it gave Gritti too much power and that he may have aspirations for the throne. This was also furthered by their sentiments that it was abnormal for Hungarian customs, as there had historically only been a governor before when the king was a child, and therefore only when the king was not yet fit to rule.

During the time of his reign, he still carried on his role in the jewel trade and utilized it as an important tool within his political work. Due to continued tensions with Ferdinand I, Gritti and Ibrahim Pasha commissioned the creation of Süleyman the Magnificent's Venetian Helmet in 1532 in order to display the Sultan's power over the Pope and the Christian empires that challenged him and his right to universal rule The helmet was designed by Gritti himself, along with a scepter and a crystal mirror that accompanied the piece for the Sultan. He had it modelled after the crown created for Pope Julius II in 1510 by Cristoforo Foppa, but with an added fourth tier, instead of the three tiers featured on the Pope's. It was then showcased in an extravagant parade and at a viewing at the Doge's Palace, which was attended by most of the Venetian Senate.

== Attempted coup ==
On 9 November 1533, the governor of Marano wrote to Charles V, Holy Roman Emperor, "I heard a few days ago that the Captain-General of Croatia apprehended and sent to (your brother's city of) Ljubljana two of Gritti's spies. They have confessed that Gritti, in the name of the Turkish Emperor, has made an alliance with the kings of England and France and also with several other princes against His Imperial and Royal Majesties (Charles and his brother Ferdinand, then King of Bohemia) and the rest of Christendom. In consequence of this the armies of the Turk, consisting of about 1,500 light horse and 22,000 hackbutiers—the whole force to be paid by the king of France—are about to invade Christendom. And it is the opinion of one of the spies that Gritti himself with his confederates will invade Croatia, Slavonia, and Hungary, and try if he can conquer those countries. Meanwhile the dukes of Bavaria and Wurtemberg and the count (landgrave) of Hesse will create disturbances in Germany, and so distress Christendom that His Imperial Majesty will find himself in trouble."

Gritti's attempt to take over Transylvania caused a general uprising but in the end he was killed along with his two sons at the siege of Medgyes. His remains were buried in the church of St. Francis in Mediaș in modern-day Romania.
