= Adoration of the Holy Name of Jesus (London) =

Practice painting by El Greco

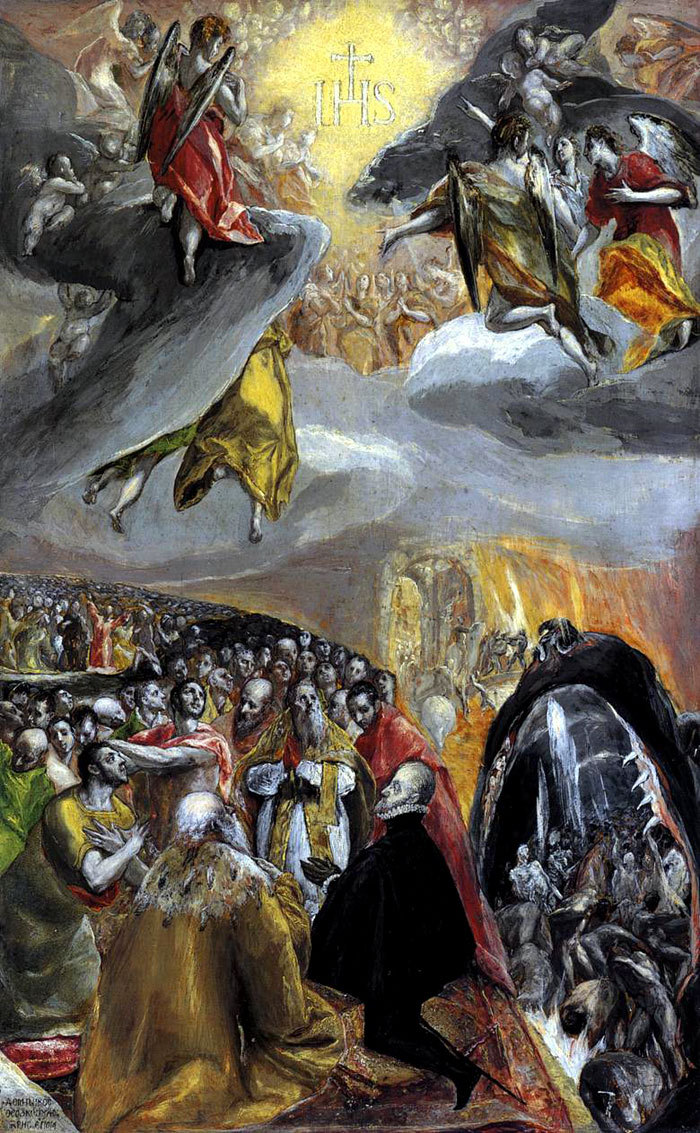

Adoration of the Holy Name of Jesus, The Glory of Philip II or Allegory of the Holy League is a c.1579 oil on canvas painting by El Greco, produced during his first Toledo period as a preparatory sketch for a work now in Madrid. It is number 116 in Harold Wethey's catalogue raisonné of the artist's works and is now in the collection of the National Gallery, London, which bought it in 1955.

It centres on a large Christogram, adored by the figures of the Doge Alvise Giovanni Mocenigo, Philip II of Spain, Pope Pius V (founder of the Holy League), Don John of Austria (the knight with his face raised and his arms outstretched to his right), Marco Antonio Colonna (the Pope's commander at the Battle of Lepanto) and a cardinal (possibly Carlo Borromeo). At bottom right is a hellmouth and behind it Purgatory.

Appearing in the 1687 catalogue of Gaspar de Haro y Fernández de Córdoba's collection, it passed to the Duchess of Alba the following year before resurfacing in the Spanish Gallery at the Louvre in 1838. Louis Philippe of France sold it in London in 1853 to William Stirling Maxwell.
