= Andrea Gritti =

Doge of Venice from 1523 to 1538

- Portrait by Titian (1540s)

77th Doge of Venice
- Dogado: 20 May 1523 – 28 December 1538
- Predecessor: Antonio Grimani
- Successor: Pietro Lando
- Born: 17 April 1455; Bardolino, Republic of Venice
- Died: 28 December 1538 (aged 83); Venice, Republic of Venice
- Burial: San Francesco della Vigna, Castello, Venice
- Spouse: Benedetta Vendramin
- Children: Francesco, Alvise
- Dynasty: Gritti family
- Father: Francesco Gritti
- Mother: Vienna Zane
- Occupation: Merchant, military officer, politician

Andrea Gritti (17 April 1455 – 28 December 1538) was the Doge of the Venetian Republic from 1523 to 1538, following a distinguished diplomatic and military career. He started out as a successful merchant in Constantinople and transitioned into the position of Bailo, a diplomatic role. Gritti was arrested for espionage but was spared execution thanks to his good relationship with the Ottoman vizier. After being freed from imprisonment, he returned to Venice and began his political career. When the War of the League of Cambrai broke out, despite his lack of experience, Gritti was given a leadership role in the Venetian military, where he excelled. After the war, he was elected doge, and he held that post until his death.

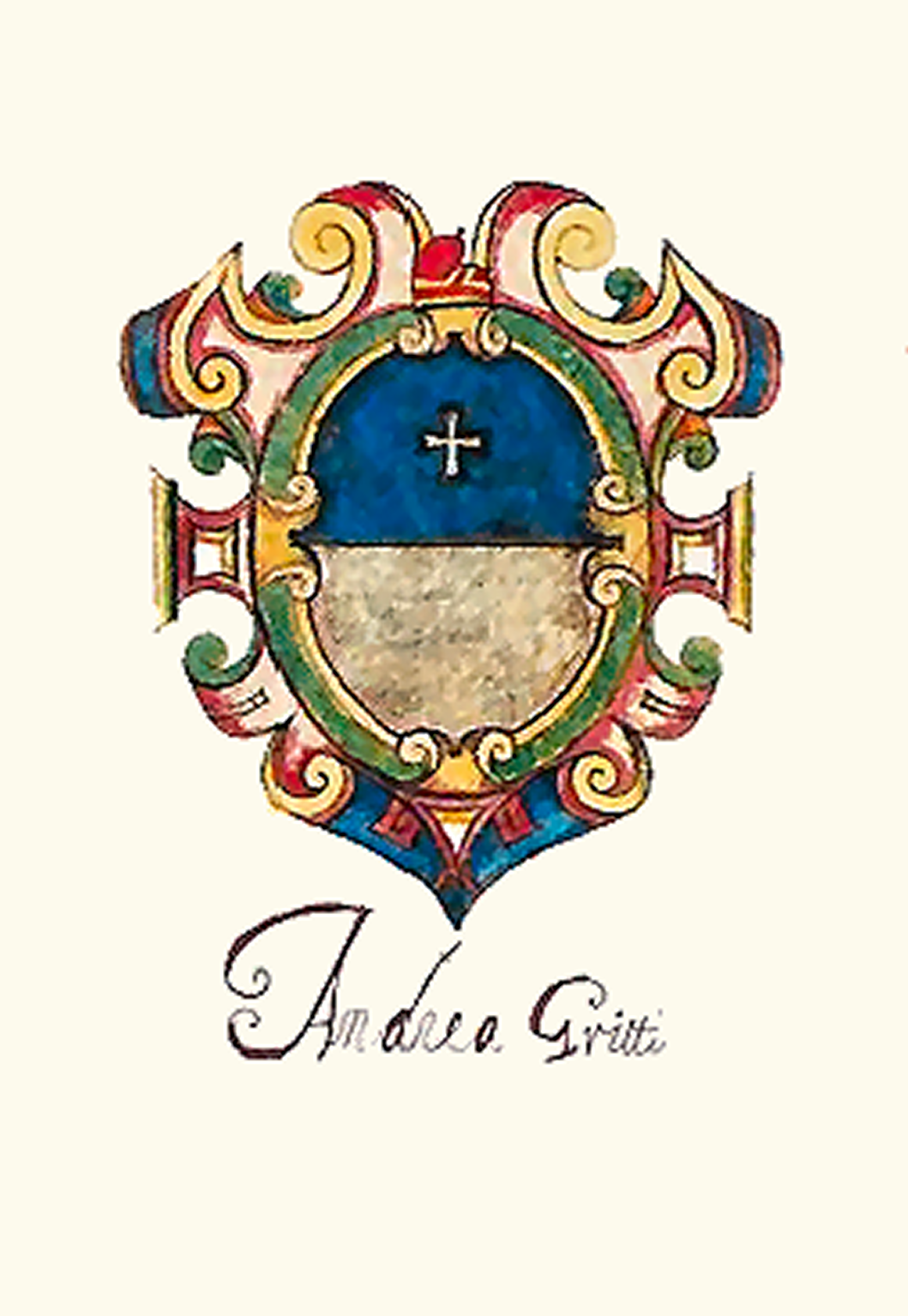
Coat of arms of Andrea Gritti

== Early life ==
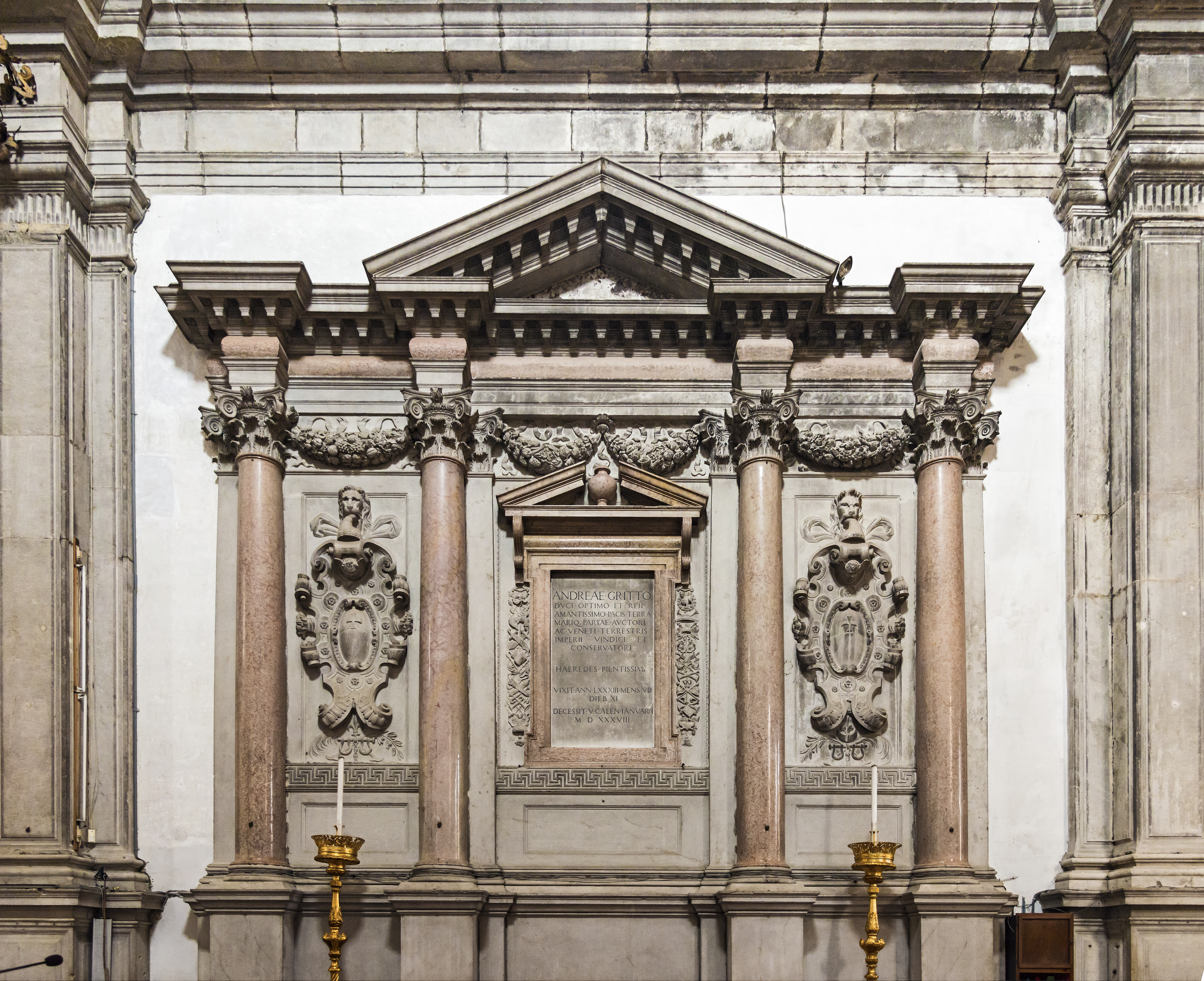
His tomb in Venice.

Andrea Gritti was born on 17 April 1455 in Bardolino, near Verona. His father, Francesco, son of Triadano Gritti, died soon after, and his mother, Vienna, daughter of Paolo Zane, remarried in 1460 to Giacomo Malipiero, with whom she had two more sons, Paolo and Michele. Andrea had a very close relationship with his half-brothers. Andrea was brought up by his paternal grandfather, receiving his first education at his grandfather's house in Venice, before going on to study at the University of Padua. At the same time he accompanied his grandfather on diplomatic missions to England, France, and Spain.

== Merchant in Constantinople ==
In 1476, he married Benedetta, daughter of Luca Vendramin, but she died the same year while giving birth to their son, Francesco. Widowed, Gritti moved to the Ottoman capital, Constantinople, where he engaged in trade, particularly of cereals, often in partnership with the Genoese merchant Pantaleo Coresi. He enjoyed the guidance of his great-uncle, Battista Gritti, who gave him insight on important officials and traders. Gritti's enterprise was successful and allowed him to live a prosperous life during his almost twenty-year stay in the city. At his home in the quarter of Galata, he lived with a Greek woman, with whom he had four illegitimate sons: Alvise, Giorgio, Lorenzo, and Pietro. He also became a person of prominence in the Italian community of Galata, serving as head of the Venetian community. He also enjoyed a good relationship with the Ottoman grand vizier, Hersekzade Ahmed Pasha, securing from him various accommodations and exemptions in exchange for frequent monetary donations, as well as the esteem of Ahmed Pasha's father-in-law, Sultan Bayezid II.

In 1492, the Venetian Bailo in Constantinople, Girolamo Marcello, was expelled on the charge of espionage. The post remained vacant, and Gritti assumed the task of representing Venice at the Ottoman court. Lacking an official appointment, however, his position was precarious, especially as, with another Ottoman–Venetian conflict looming in 1499, he used his commercial correspondence, sent via Corfu and the Ragusan merchant Nicolò Gondola, to transmit encoded information to the Venetian Senate regarding the movements of the Ottoman navy (referred to as "carpets" in one letter) and troop concentrations. This activity did not remain hidden from the Turks for long, however: after capturing couriers bearing Gritti's letters, in August 1499 he was imprisoned in the Yedikule Fortress, escaping execution only through his friendship with the grand vizier. According to contemporary reports, his imprisonment caused great consternation among his many friends—including Turks—at the Ottoman capital, as well as the many women who were enamoured of him.

Gritti nevertheless spent 32 months in the fortress, along with other Venetian merchants, coming close to death due to the privations of this long imprisonment. He was released after a ransom of 2,400 ducats was paid, and returned to Venice. Gritti played a role in the negotiations and conclusion of the peace treaty with the Ottoman Empire in December 1502, and then took active part in the reception of the Ottoman ambassador Ali Bey and the finalization of the treaty on 20 May 1503. Gritti's experience with the diplomatic customs of the Ottomans led to his being charged with overseeing the final formulation of the treaty's clauses, so as to remove any ambiguities and causes for misinterpretation. Finally, on 22 May, he left Venice with Ali Bey for Constantinople, bearing the draft treaty and a letter from the Doge to the Sultan. After the ratification of the treaty by the Sultan, he returned to Venice, making his report in the Senate on 2 December 1503.

== Political and military career ==
The war and his long imprisonment put an end to Gritti's commercial career, costing him the enormous sum of 24,000 ducats. With little hope of recompense for his losses, he was forced in 1517 to ask the Senate's permission to accept a gift from the King of France as partial restitution of his losses. Rather than retiring, however, he now embarked on an active political career. He became a member of the—largely ineffective—committee tasked with recovering the losses suffered by the Venetian merchants in Constantinople, served as ducal councillor for the sestiere of Castello, and was member of the financial committee attached to the Council of Ten and of the Venetian delegation sent to Pope Julius II in October 1505, before becoming head of the Council of Ten.

=== War of the League of Cambrai ===
In 1508, as the Republic's relations with the Holy Roman Empire broke down, leading to the outbreak of the War of the League of Cambrai, Gritti was appointed provveditore generale along with Giorgio Corner. The appointment signalled the beginning of a long military career, and was remarkable given his complete lack of military background. However, it was a sign of the Gritti's unique qualities: he was held in high regard by the Venetian patriciate, which among other things meant that he was able to ensure the flow of money to the army, while at the same time being able to ingratiate himself with the Republic's mercenary captains, and to ensure that the Republic's intentions were actually carried out by them. As provveditore generale, he toured the Venetian possessions on the Italian mainland, especially inspecting the fortifications of the Trentino. He then was elected a member of the Ten, and savio del consiglio, before being elected Procurator of Saint Mark's de supra on 12 April 1509.

Gritti was soon appointed as provveditore generale to the Venetian field army, where he distinguished himself for his energy and capacity to endure hardship. With 1,500 men he reinforced the Venetian commander-in-chief, Niccolò di Pitigliano, in the Bresciano, and with 2,000 men he went to the aid of Cremona. He participated in the disastrous Venetian defeat at the Battle of Agnadello against the French on 14 May, but managed to escape to Brescia, carrying along a Banner of Saint Mark, that he later dedicated to the Santi Giovanni e Paolo church.

The battle led to the collapse of Venetian rule in the Italian mainland—apart from Treviso, all Venetian conquests of the past century were undone, and French forces reached even the Venetian Lagoon. The news provoked panic and despair in Venice, which prepared for a siege. At the same time, it became clear that not all was lost: Agnadello had involved only part of the Venetian army, and the Venetians remained disposed to continue fighting. Gritti himself, through his undaunted conduct, became a symbol of that determination. He was immediately appointed as commander at Treviso, and soon gave proof of the Venetian resolve by recapturing Padua.

Hostility to Venetian rule was widespread in Padua, among nobility and commoners alike, and Venice abandoned it in early June. When Louis XII of France disbanded his army near Milan a month later, the Venetians decided to act. Therein from 17 to 19 July, Gritti led his army in capturing Padua and its citadel, in an operation that encountered only slight resistance and resembled more a "vast, tumultuous pageant than a strictly military exercise", but whose symbolic value was immense, and which made Gritti's political fortune, ultimately opening his way to the dogeship. Gritti instituted a harsh suppression of anti-Venetian elements in Padua, with arrests, executions, confiscations of property, and the exile of over 300 people to Venice. At the same time, however, he took care to impose strict discipline on his own troops, and prevent Venetian nobles from enriching themselves at the expense of the Paduans.

At the same time, Gritti was quick to realize the importance of the burgeoning, spontaneous peasant resistance against the Imperial forces, which quickly widened into acts of guerrilla warfare. His own capture of Padua was assisted by armed peasants, and on 23 July he urged the Signoria of Venice to embrace this movement as part of a broader strategy to turn the tide of the war. As a result, the Venetian government promised the peasants suspension of all taxes and the cancellation of debts.

In 1510, following the death of Niccolò di Pitigliano, Gritti took command of Venice's army but was forced to withdraw to Venice by French advances. He continued as provveditore through end of the conflict. In February 1512, he was captured by the French in the Sack of Brescia and imprisoned in the Sforza Castle in Milan, until November 1512. In 1512, he led the negotiations with Francis I of France that resulted in Venice leaving the League and allying with France.

== Dogeship ==
Elected Doge in 1523, Gritti concluded a treaty with Charles V, ending Venice's active involvement in the Italian Wars. He attempted to maintain the neutrality of the Republic in the face of the continued struggle between Charles and Francis, urging both to turn their attention to the advances of the Ottoman Empire in Hungary. However, he could not prevent Suleiman I from attacking Corfu in 1537, drawing Venice into a new war with the Ottomans. Since he never remarried, technically-speaking his dogaressa was the long-deceased Benedetta Vendramin. Much of the events of recounted by Marino Sanuto the Younger in his diaries occur contemporaneously during Gritti's duchy.

Gritti acquired the Palazzo Pisani Gritti as his private residence in 1525.

Gritti died on 28 December 1538 at the age of 83.

== Popular culture ==
- A portrait of Andrea Gritti sometimes appears in the loading screen of the PC strategy game, Europa Universalis IV, as well as Europa Universalis: the Price of Power, a board game.
- A portrait of Andrea Gritti is also featured in the live action video game, MagiQuest. When you cast at the portrait, his eyes glow red.*

== Sources ==
- Benzoni, Gino (2002). "GRITTI, Andrea". Dizionario Biografico degli Italiani (in Italian). Vol. 59: Graziano–Grossi Gondi. Rome: Istituto dell'Enciclopedia Italiana. ISBN 978-88-12-00032-6.
- Finlay, Robert (2000). "Fabius Maximus in Venice: Doge Andrea Gritti, the War of Cambrai, and the Rise of Habsburg Hegemony, 1509–1530". Renaissance Quarterly. 53 (4): 988–1031. doi:10.2307/2901454. JSTOR 2901454. S2CID 155791278.
- Norwich, John Julius (1989). A History of Venice. New York: Vintage Books. ISBN 0-679-72197-5.

Political offices
Preceded by Antonio Grimani	Doge of Venice; 1523–1538	Succeeded by Pietro Lando
