= Alfonso d'Avalos Addressing his Troops =

c. 1540 painting by Titian

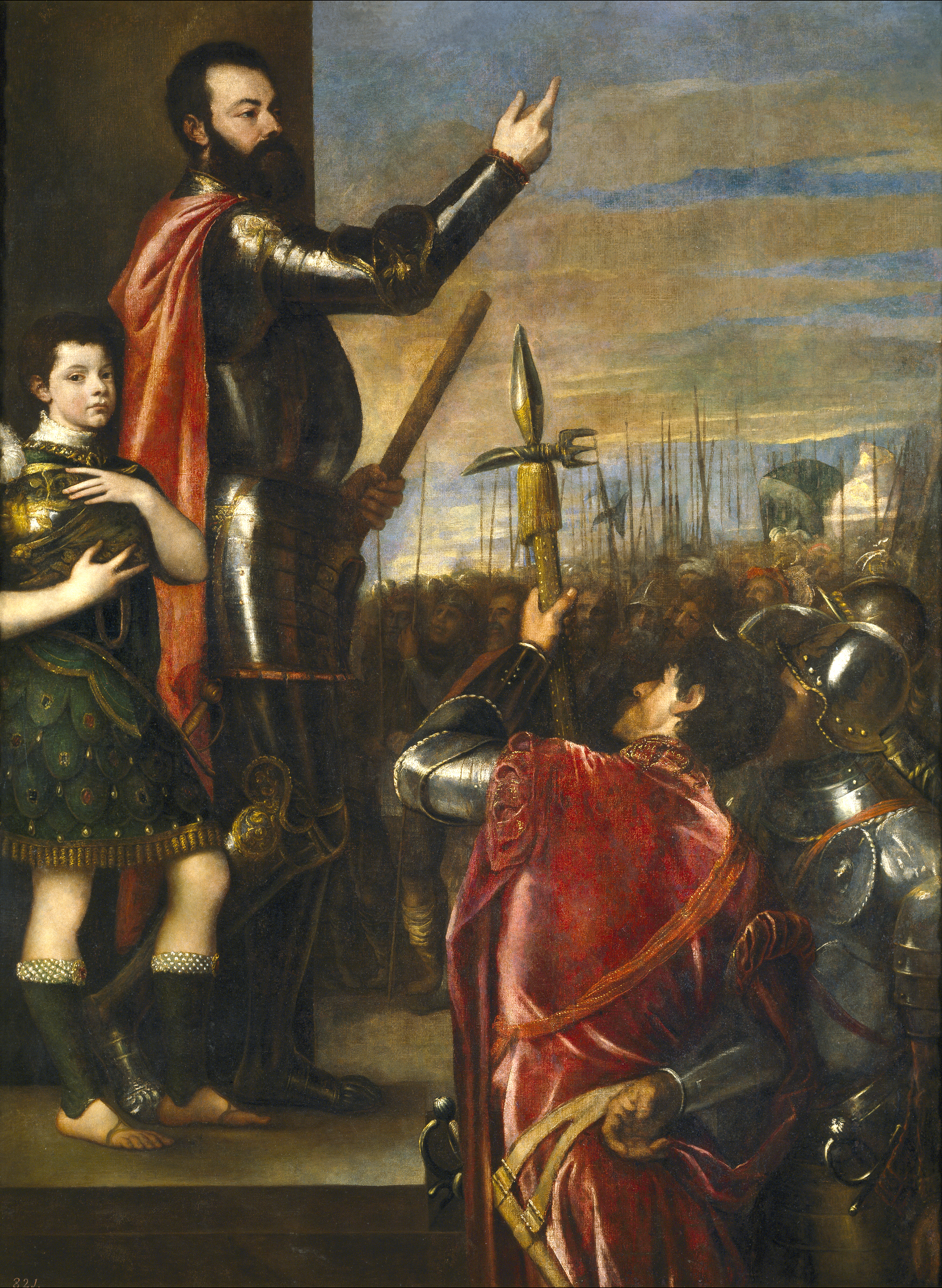
- Artist: Titian
- Year: c. 1540
- Medium: oil on canvas
- Dimensions: 223 cm × 165 cm (88 in × 65 in)
- Location: Museo del Prado, Madrid

Alfonso d'Avalos Addressing his Troops (Spanish: Alocución del Marqués del Vasto) is a portrait of Alfonso d'Avalos by Titian, painted in around 1540 and now held at the Museo del Prado, in Madrid. Alfonso d'Avalos, Marquise del Vasto, was a noble Neapolitan, descended from a family of Castilian origin. He participated in the Battle of Pavia and the conquest of Tunis in 1535. In 1538 he was appointed governor of Milan. Military failures caused a subsequent falling out of favor with the Emperor Charles V.

This work is both a portrait of the Marquis del Vasto and a picture of history narrating an incident that occurred in 1537. The Spanish troops stationed in Milan began an attempted mutiny over not receiving their pay, but the conflict was suppressed by the Marquis' eloquent speech to the men that inspired loyalty and guaranteed their pay given patience. He, having to leave for affairs elsewhere, left his son with the troops as a guarantee they would be paid.

The Marquis contracted Titian to paint the scene, depicting his son as a page holding his helmet for him during the speech. The composition is based on classical models, such as the reliefs of the Arch of Constantine and numerous Numismatic works. Titian features the General in an elevated position, addressing his men, and emphasizing his words, as advised classical oratory manuals, with elevation of the right arm.

The work was commissioned in 1539 by the Marquis himself, during a trip to Venice. His first public exhibition was in Milan during 1541, taking advantage of the visit of Emperor Charles. It was subsequently acquired by the Gonzaga family, Dukes of Mantua, and finally by King Charles I of England. When this king was executed his assets were auctioned, and the painting (like others of the same king) was acquired by Philip IV of Spain. In 1828 Ferdinand VII ceded it to the collection to the Museo del Prado.
