= La Gloria (Titian) =

1554 painting by Titian

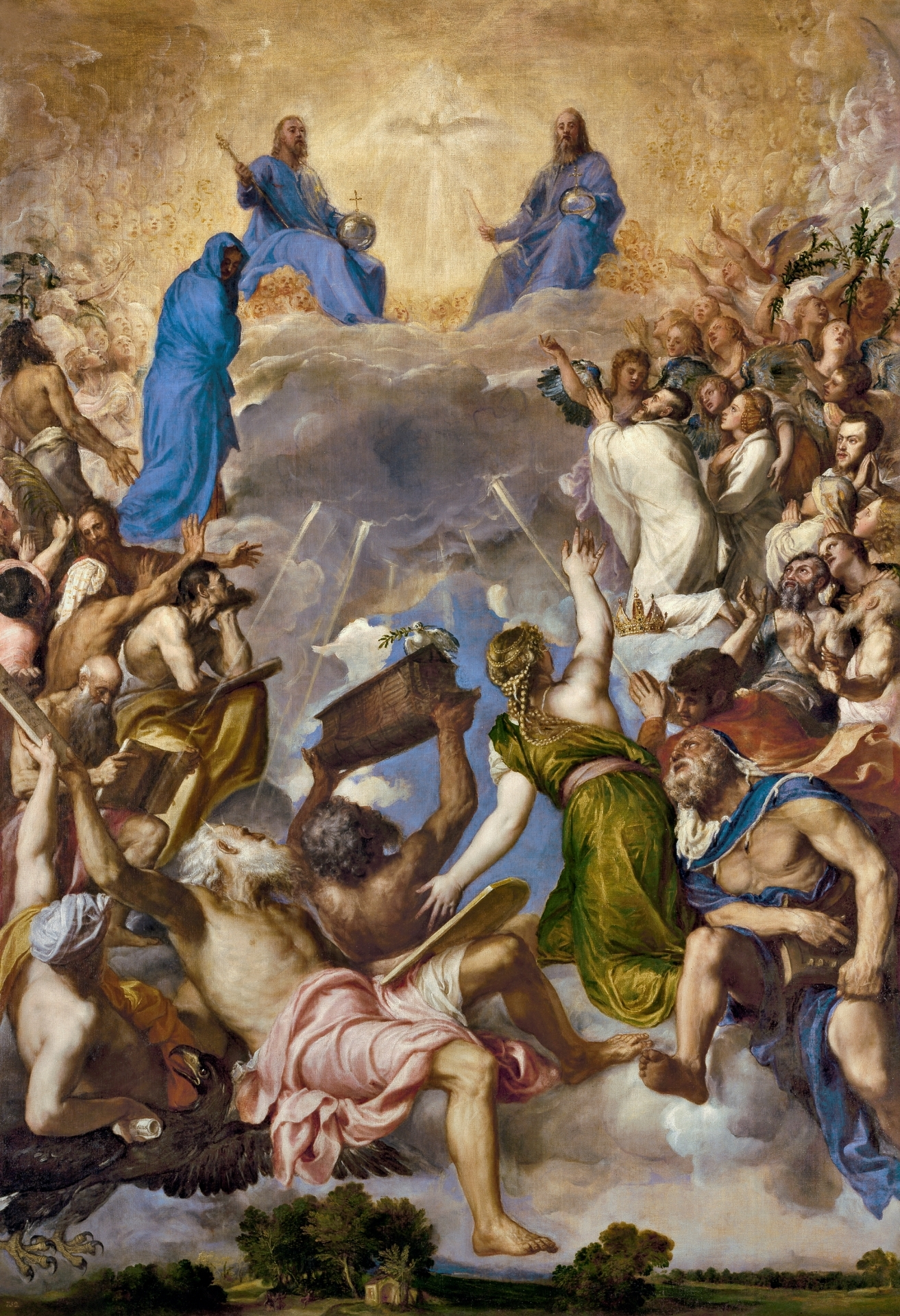
- Artist: Titian
- Year: c. 1550-1554
- Medium: Oil on canvas
- Dimensions: 346 cm × 240 cm (136 in × 94 in)
- Location: Museo del Prado, Madrid

La Gloria is a painting by Titian, commissioned by Charles V in 1550 or 1551 and completed in 1554. It was first given this title by José Sigüenza in 1601 — it is also known as The Trinity, The Final Judgement, Paradise, and Adoration of the Trinity. It is held in the Museo del Prado, in Madrid.

== Description ==
It shows an image from Augustine of Hippo's The City of God describing the glory gained by the blessed and on the right includes Charles himself, with his wife Isabella of Portugal, his son Philip II of Spain, his daughter Joanna of Austria, his sisters: Mary of Hungary and Eleanor of Austria, all wearing their shrouds. Titian's signature is shown on a scroll held by John the Evangelist. The Museo del Prado states, "On a lower level [at the right] are two elderly bearded men identified as Pietro Aretino and Titian himself in profile".

At the top is an image of the Holy Trinity next to the Virgin Mary and Saint John the Baptist. The painting also features King David, Moses and Noah, along with a figure in green identified as Mary Magdalene, the Erythraean Sibyl, Judith, Rachel or the Catholic Church.

Charles took it to the Monastery of Yuste on his retirement there. Charles's son, Philip II, had it moved to the Escorial Monastery, where it remained until 1837, when it was mentioned as among the works in the Museo del Prado, where it is today.

== See also ==
- List of works by Titian
