= Portrait of Pietro Aretino =

Painting by Titian

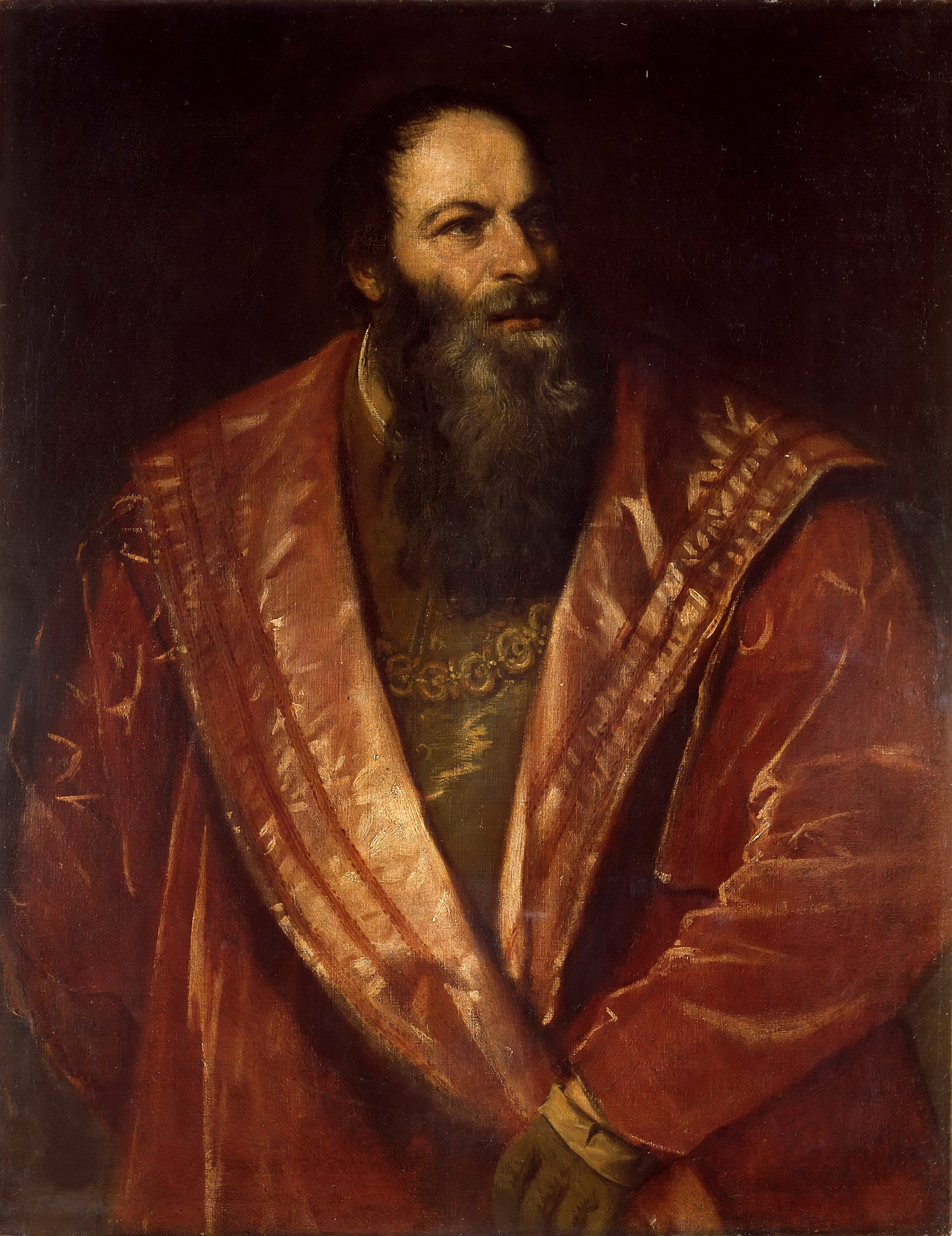
- Artist: Titian
- Year: 1545
- Medium: oil on canvas
- Dimensions: 96.7 cm × 76.6 cm (38.1 in × 30.2 in)
- Location: Palazzo Pitti, Florence

The Portrait of Pietro Aretino is an oil on canvas portrait of the Renaissance poet Pietro Aretino by Titian, painted around 1545, possibly for Cosimo I de' Medici. It is now in the Sala di Venere of the Palazzo Pitti in Florence. Titian painted two other portraits of Aretino: a 1527 portrait in the Kunstmuseum Basel and a 1537 portrait in the Frick Collection.
