= Pauly & C. – Compagnia Venezia Murano =

Venetian glass company

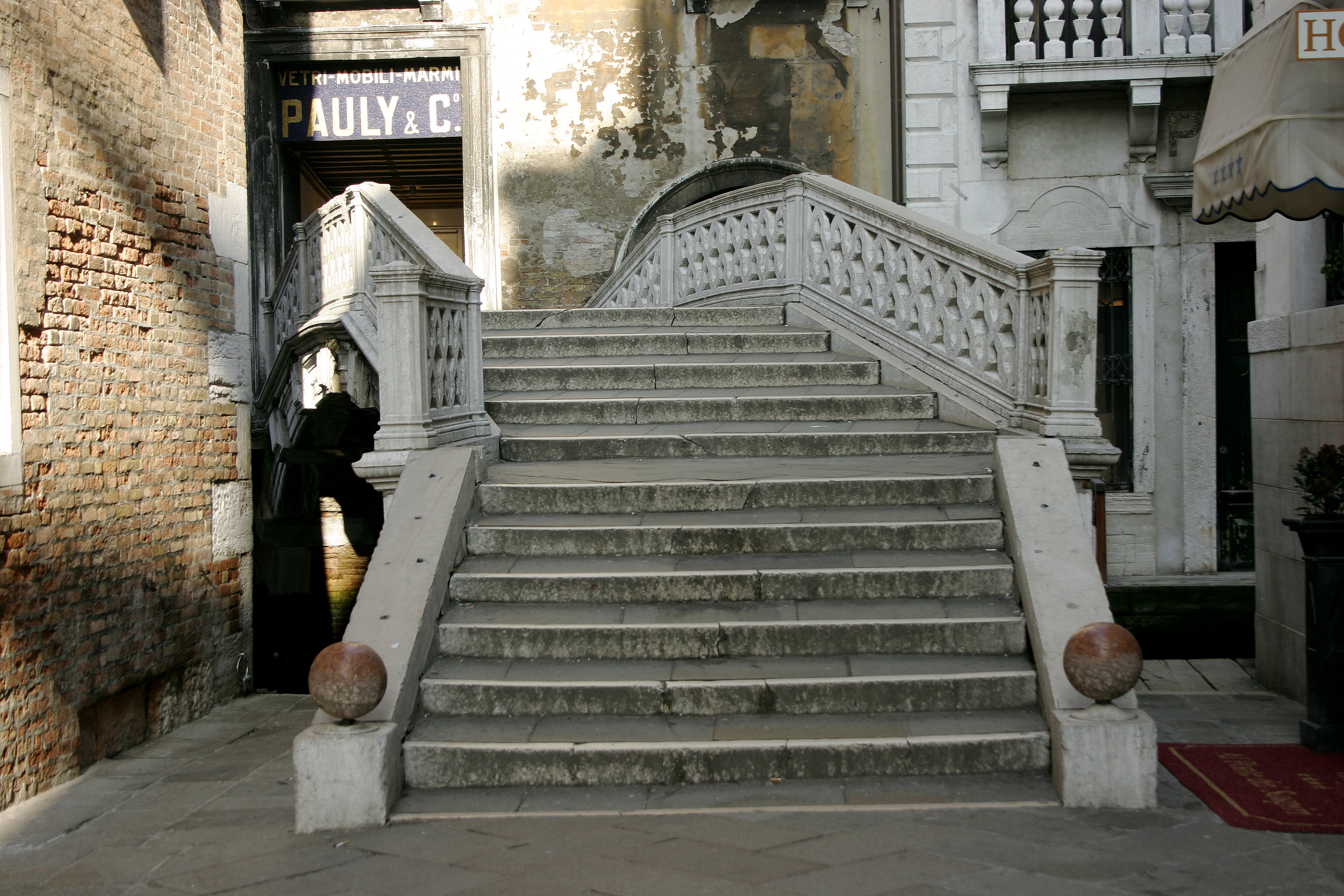
Entry of Pauly in Venice.

Pauly & C. - Compagnia Venezia Murano is one of the oldest glass factories of Murano: it was founded more than 150 years ago. The company produces glass art, most notably Roman murrine, mosaics and chandeliers.

The company was formed in 1919 by a merger of Pauly & C (founded in 1902) and the Compagnia di Venezia e Murano (founded in 1866). It has since expanded in 1932 with the acquisition of MVM Cappellin & C. along with its drawings and back catalogues. In 1990, the company also acquired Toso Vetri d’Arte glassworks. The company maintains retail showrooms as well as exhibiting antiques.

Two generations of famous master glassmakers were formed in the glass factory of Pauly & C. - Compagnia di Venezia e Murano. At a later time, they split off from it in order to establish their own ones and the main labels of Murano glass such as Barovier, Seguso, Toso.

== History: the Origins ==
=== Compagnia di Venezia e Murano ===
CVM - Compagnia di Venezia e Murano began as Salviati &C. in London in 1866 under the direction of Vicenza attorney Antonio Salviati and with the backing of two British men: archaeologist Austen Henry Layard and antiquarian Sir William Drake. The company was dedicated to using ancient techniques and utilized master glassblowers in its efforts to do so. It called in specialists from other fields like goldsmithing and engraving to ensure authenticity and employed artist Giuseppe Devers to teach the techniques of enamelling and heat-applied glass gilding to company artisans. Archaeologist Layard was particularly interested in the mosaic glass techniques of Roman and pre-Roman artists, and he spent years personally overseeing the work of the company's technicians and glassblowers in attempting to revive those techniques. In 1872, the company was successful, managing to replicate the type of glass commonly known as "murrina" (plural, "murrine").

The company was renamed Venice & Murano Glass and Mosaic Co. Ltd, known more simply CVM - Company of Venice and Murano in 1872, and, in 1877, Layard purchased Salviati's interest so that Salviati could pursue other interests. The company quickly earned a reputation for quality original glass art and reproductions as well as its many mural mosaics in Great Britain and elsewhere in Europe. In 1878, the murrine produced by Compagnia di Venezia e Murano was included in its exhibit at the International Exhibition in Paris, which was the chief attraction in Italian glass. In its observations of the display, the United States Commission to the Paris exposition commented not only on "Roman murrhine glass", but also particularly on the mural glass mosaics, the "perfection of which" had "engaged the earnest attention of the company." Mosaics produced by the company during the time period are still in existence in diverse areas such as Gonville and Caius College Chapel in Cambridge; St Paul's Within the Walls in Rome, the Victoria and Albert Museum, Westminster Cathedral in London, Old South Church in Boston the Chamberlain Memorial in Birmingham, Palazzo Barbarigo and the Senate House rooms in the United States. The last specimen, a portrait of Abraham Lincoln, was produced and donated in 1866.

Through the last years of the 19th century, CVM - Compagnia di Venezia e Murano took part in many other displays. Prior to the 1878 exhibition in Paris, it had shown at the Maritime Exhibition in Naples and the Trieste Exhibition in 1871 and at the International Exhibition in Vienna in 1873, where it won 13 prizes for decorative arts. It unveiled a new focus in 1881 with the display of the first of its glass phoenixes at the National Exhibition in Milan. It exported several thousand works for display at the World's Columbian Exposition in Chicago in 1893, also setting up a kiln so that the public could observe the company's glass blowing techniques. In 1895, it exhibited at the first Venice Biennale (an event at which it would also feature later), with artisan Vincenzo Moretti taking prizes and artisan Attilio Spaccarelli earning special note for his engraving.

1900 saw a change in the company when its British owners sold their interest to a businessman from Venice named Tosolini, who was the owner of shops in St. Mark's Square. Under Tosoloni's ownership, the company stopped production in 1909, though it continued commercial distribution at St. Mark's Square.

=== Merger with Pauly & C ===
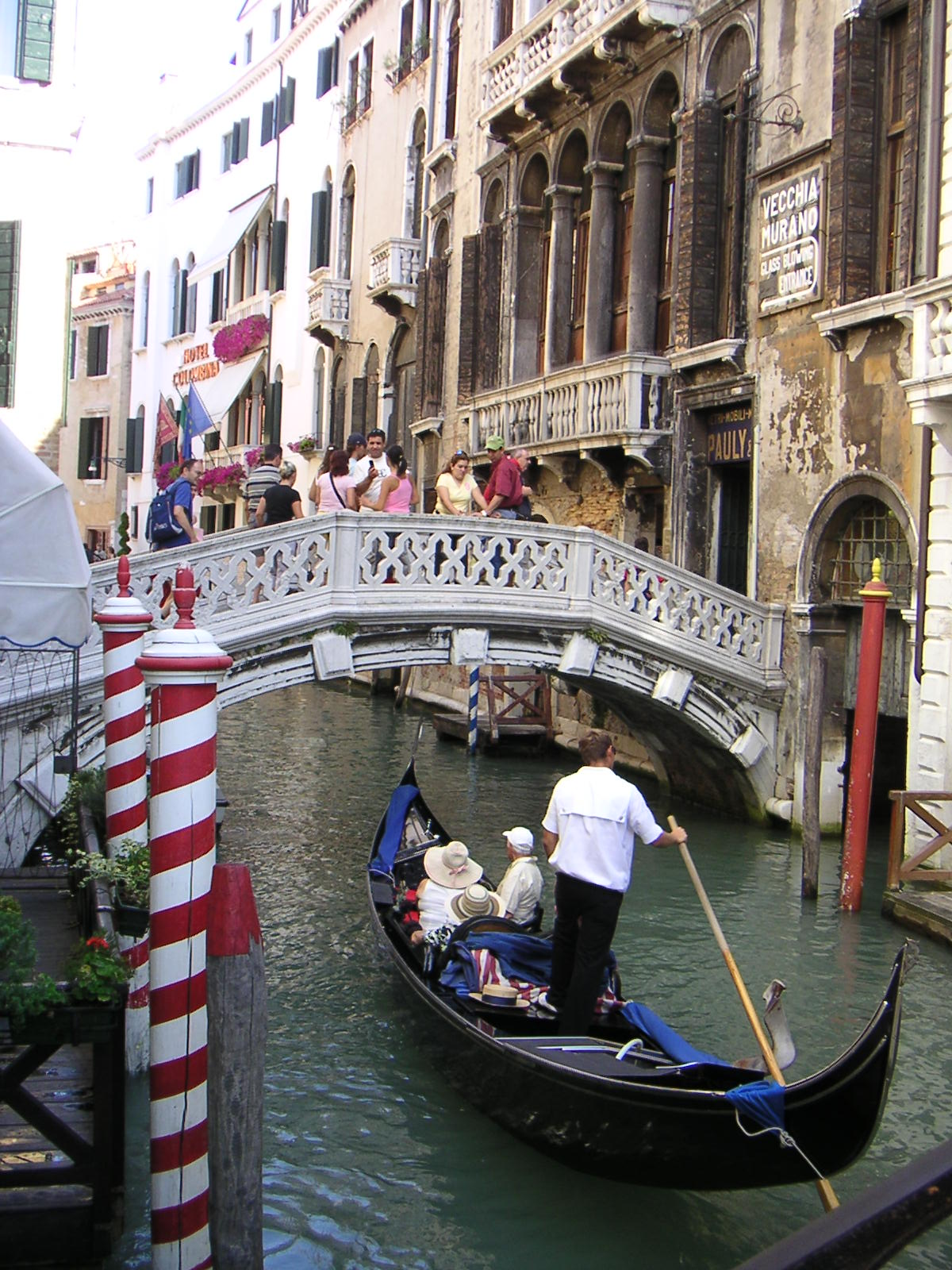
Ponte dei Consorzi, front entry of Palazzo Cappello Trevisan in Venice.

Pauly & C was formed in 1903 by Emilio Pauly, Alessandro Hirscber Hellman, Vittorio Emanuele Toldo and Ernesto Graziadei, opening showrooms in Palazzo Trevisan Cappello, which would remain the headquarters of the company until its closure in 2007 for restoration. In 1919, Pauly & C. and Compagnia di Venezia e Murano were both purchased by the Milan Società Anonima Sanitaria, which resold them the following year to Gaetano Ceschina of Milan. The newly merged company, retitled to its present name, continued display in its previous locations of St. Mark's Square and the Palazzo Trevisan Cappello. In 1925, the merged company resumed production of glassworks on Murano and began exhibiting again at the Monza Tirennale.

=== Post-merger growth and development ===
The company grew in 1933 with the acquisition of Maestri Vetrai Muranesi Cappellin, or MVM Cappellin, a glass company formed in 1925 by Paolo Venini and Giacomo Cappellin, which transferred to them rights to the works and designs of the MVM Cappellin artists such as Vittorio Zecchin and Carlo Scarpa. The company expanded into commissioned chandeliers, with notable pieces from the period being placed in such locations as the Palazzo del Quirinale in Rome; the Vatican Palace, and the Royal Palace in Copenhagen. More recently, interior lighting has been designed for such places as the Palazzo Bezzi in Ravenna and the Al Assawi family palace. In 1990, the company again expanded with the acquisition of Toso Vetri d’Arte glassworks.

=== The new century ===
Ceschina sold his interest in the company in 1963 to the Barbon family, who retained it until 1976, when they sold to Andrea Boscaro. Boscaro owned the company for almost 30 years before 2005.

In December 2018, Pauly 1866, MVM Cappellin, e C.V.M. Compagnia Venezia Murano were acquired by the Venetian company iDOGI, which works in the field of the artistic glass for over half a century.

== Artistic associations ==
The company has a long history of association with international artisans. In the period following the second World War, the company undertook long-term associations with master glassblowers Anzolo Fuga and Alfredo Barbini, engraver Francesco Andolfato and painter Enzo Scarpa. Shorter associations include sculptor Napoleone Martinuzzi in the 1960s, painter Libero Vitali in 1971, architect Franz Prati between 1996 and 1997, and fashion designer Romeo Gigli in 1997. In the later 1990s, the company also featured exclusive designs by Heinz Oestergaard, Maria Teresa Lorella Gnutti and Berit Johansson, whose association with the company persisted. Since the turn of the century, associations have included Venetian sculptor Livio de Marchi and Chinese artist Xiao Fan Ru.

== Museum display ==
Glass art produced by Pauly & C. – Compagnia Venezia Murano is on display in a number of museums. Among them:

- The Victoria and Albert Museum in London, UK
- The Metropolitan Museum of Art in New York, USA
- The Cantor Arts Center at Stanford University, California
- The Corning Museum of Glass in New York, USA
- The Museo del Vetro, Murano, Venice, Italy

== Quotes ==
"The human gestures around those elegant creatures of fire, breath and iron were extraordinarily agile and light, like the gestures of a silent dance."

In this passage of "Il fuoco", D'Annunzio writes about one of his trips to the Pauly & C. | CVM glassworks, which he had visited years before to see his friend, the master glassblower Isidoro Seguso.

== Sources ==
- Blake, William P. (1880). Reports of the United States Commissioners to the Paris Universal Exposition, 1878. Published Under Direction of the Secretary of State by Authority of Congress. Vol. 3. Govt. Print. Off. pp. 238, 241.
