= Palazzo Barbarigo =

Building in Dorsoduro, Venice, Italy

Coordinates: 45.431°N 12.3306°E

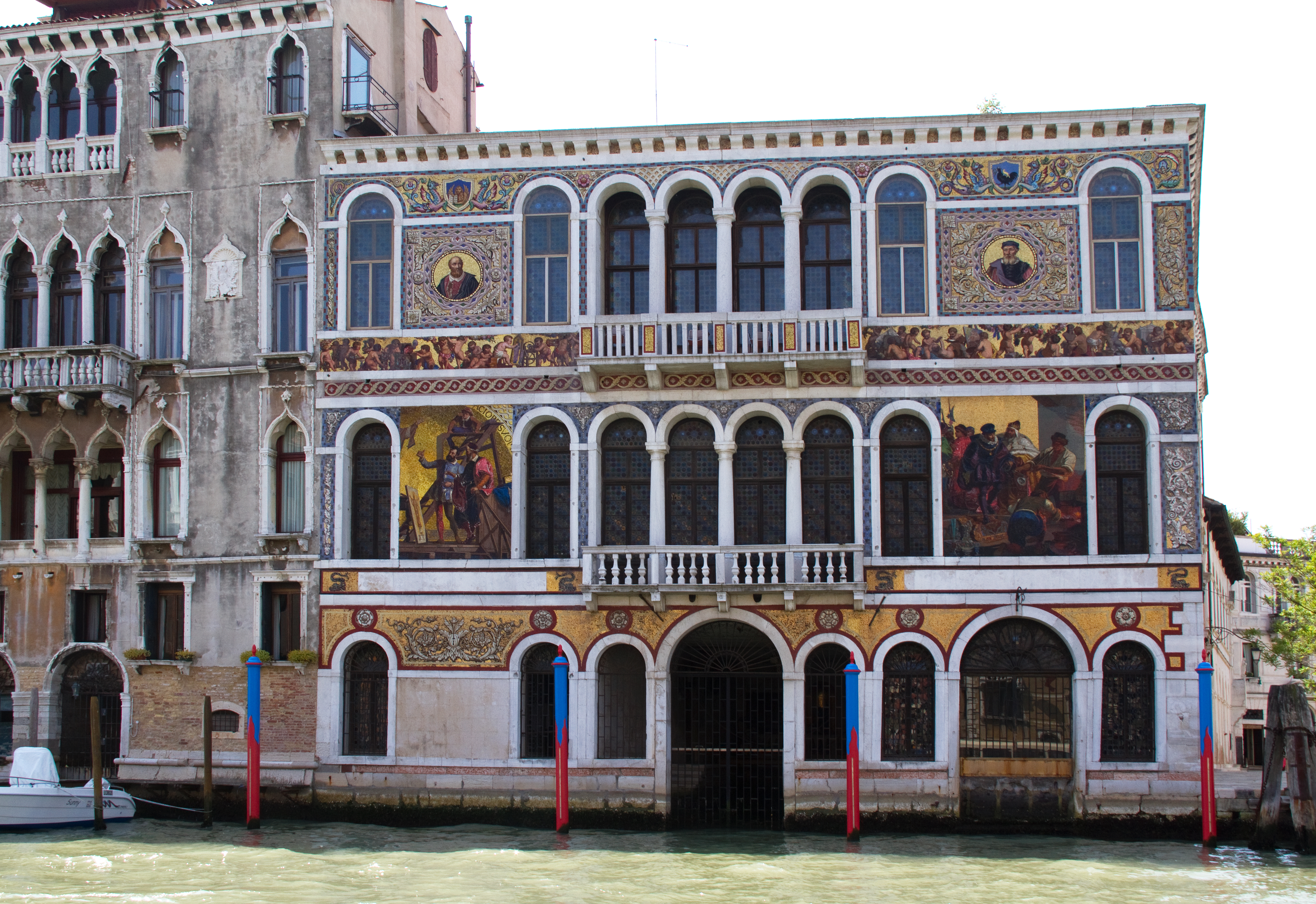
Palazzo Barbarigo

Palazzo Barbarigo is a palace situated facing the Grand Canal of Venice, Italy. It is not to be confused with the Palazzo Barbarigo Minotto and Palazzo Barbarigo della Terrazza, both also on the Grand Canal, and other palazzi, and several villas, once owned by the Barbarigo family.

According to an investigation by the Anti-Corruption Foundation (Russia), the property, together with a part of adjacent palazzo, belongs to Russian conductor Valery Gergiev. It is a small part of the vast inheritance of the philanthropist Yoko Nagae Ceschina, who died in 2015.

== History ==
Originally built in the 16th century, it is distinguished by its mosaics of Murano glass applied in 1886 by the Testolini Brothers, the most important business in the Venetian applied arts scene, which had made the palace its sales headquarters for glass products. At the time it was owned by the proprietors of one of the glass factories, who were inspired by the exterior mosaics on the facade of St Mark's Basilica to apply those to the palace. When the mosaics were installed, the then new owners were decried by their more aristocratic neighbours as nouveaux riches, and their taste garish and out of keeping with the genteel decay of the neighbouring buildings. However, it should be remembered that many of the Renaissance palazzi on the canal were once too covered in polychrome and gilt decorations, with elaborate plaster and stucco work.

Later during the 1920s, Palazzo Barbarigo served as the headquarters of Pauly & C. – Compagnia Venezia Murano, one of the oldest glass factories in Murano. Part of the Palazzo Barbarigo is today a showroom and shop for Murano glass.

The palazzo follows the Renaissance pattern of design on three floors: an open loggia gives access to the canal surmounted by a piano nobile with open loggias and decorated columns, with a "secondo piano nobile" (secondary floor) above. The comparatively modern mosaics probably cover original windows, and obliviate the original design.
