= Venetian glass =

Glassmaking tradition from Venice, Italy

Murano vase, around 1600, Hermitage Museum

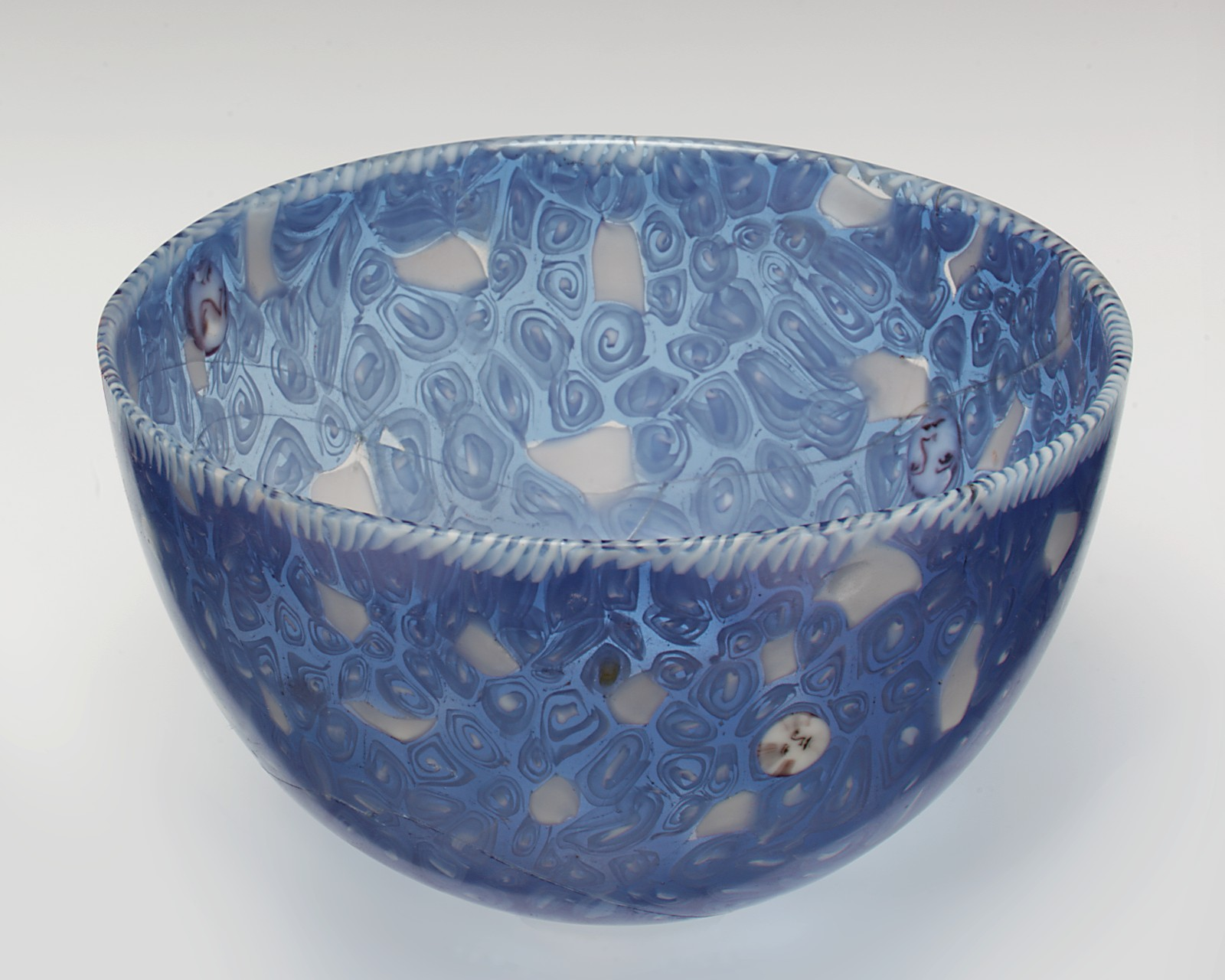
Decorated bowl from Murano, c. 1870

Venetian glass (Italian: vetro veneziano) is glassware made in Venice, typically on the island of Murano near the city. Traditionally it is made with a soda–lime "metal" and is typically elaborately decorated, with various "hot" glass-forming techniques, as well as gilding, enamel, or engraving. Production has been concentrated on the Venetian island of Murano since the 13th century. Today Murano is known for its art glass, but it has a long history of innovations in glassmaking in addition to its artistic fame—and was Europe's major center for luxury glass from the High Middle Ages to the Italian Renaissance. During the 15th century, Murano glassmakers created cristallo—which was almost transparent and considered the finest glass in the world. Murano glassmakers also developed a white-colored glass (milk glass called lattimo) that looked like porcelain. They later became Europe's finest makers of mirrors.

During the Early Middle Ages, Venice was originally controlled by the Eastern Roman Empire before eventually becoming an independent city state. It flourished as a trading center and seaport in the High Middle Ages. Its connections with the Middle East helped its glassmakers gain additional skills, as glassmaking was more advanced in areas such as Syria and Egypt. Although Venetian glassmaking in factories existed as far back as the eighth century, it became concentrated in Murano by law beginning in 1291, in part because glass factories often caught fire, and moving all of them to one island removed much of the possibility of a major fire disaster for the rest of the city. Another reason for moving the glassmakers to Murano was that Venetian glassmakers developed secret recipes and methods for making glass, and the concentration of Venice's glassmaking on the island of Murano enabled better control of those secrets.

Murano became Europe's luxury glassmaking center, peaking in popularity in the 15th and 16th centuries. According to historian W. Patrick McCray, the Murano glass industry's rise in the Renaissance was shaped by a close interplay of consumer demand, skilled craftsmanship, and strict state regulation, which together elevated glass from an artisan product to a luxury art form. Venice's dominance in trade along the Mediterranean created a wealthy merchant class that was a strong connoisseur of the arts. This helped establish demand for art glass and more innovations. The spread of glassmaking talent in Europe eventually diminished the importance of Venice and its Murano glassmakers. The occupation and dissolution of the Venetian state by Napoleon Bonaparte in 1797 caused more hardship for Murano's glassmaking industry. Murano glassmaking began a revival in the 1920s. Today, Murano and Venice are tourist attractions, and Murano is home to numerous glass factories and a few individual artists' studios. Its Museo del Vetro (Glass Museum) in the Palazzo Giustinian contains displays on the history of glassmaking as well as glass samples ranging from Egyptian times through the present day.

== Late Antiquity and Middle Ages ==
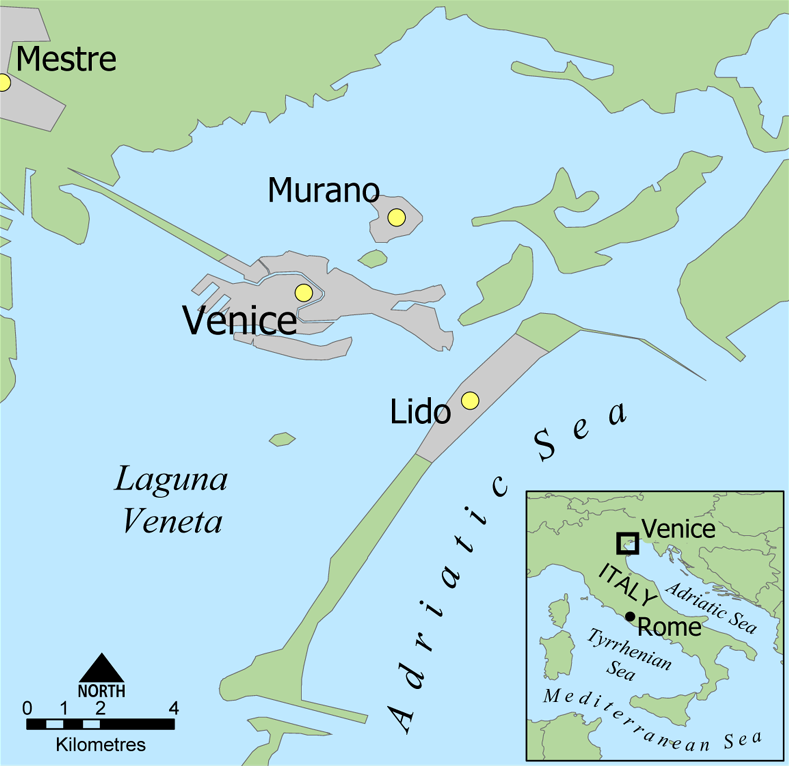
Venice and Murano

The Venetian city state grew during the decline of the Roman Empire in the fifth century, as people fled the barbarian invasions to the safety of islands in the Venetian Lagoon. Small communities grew in the lagoon, among which Venice eventually became the most prominent. The city of Venice became a highly successful trading port, and by the beginning of the 11th century dominated trade between Europe, North Africa, and the Middle East. It also had a strong navy. Many European Crusaders passed through Venice on their way to and from the Holy Land. Treasures of many kinds were bought and sold in Venice: spices, precious metals, gemstones, ivory, silks—and glass. Successful trade bred a wealthy merchant class in addition to the nobles, and the wealthy became patrons of Venice's famous art and architecture.

It is thought that glass production in Venice began as early as 450, when glassmakers from Aquileia fled to the islands to escape barbarian invaders. (Note: There are two main theories about the beginning of Venetian glassmaking. One is that glassmaking began as glassmakers from Aquileia arrived after fleeing barbarian invasions during the fifth century. A 19th-century author credits Italian writers Carlo Marin and the Count Filiasi for this idea. Shotwell supports this theory and uses the year 450 as the approximate start date. A second theory is that Venetian glassmaking developed from Venetian interaction and trade with the Levant (Eastern Mediterranean). Janssens says that "similarities in techniques and forms between Venetian glass and Byzantine and Islamic glass are evident".) The earliest archaeological evidence of a glass factory in the area comes from the Venetian lagoon island of Torcello and dates from the seventh or eighth century. The original Venetian glassmakers were joined by glassmakers from Byzantium and from the Middle East—which enriched their glassmaking knowledge. Glass was made in the Middle East long before it was made in Europe, though Ancient Roman glass made in Italy, Germany and elsewhere could be extremely sophisticated. (Note: The region between the Tigris and Euphrates rivers is considered the birthplace of glassmaking. Glass was made there before 2000 BCE while glass was made in Syria as far back as 1700 BCE. Around 100 BCE the Syrians started glassblowing.) Early products included beads, glass for mosaics, jewelry, small mirrors, and window glass.

Venetian glassmaking grew in importance to the city's economy. Around 1271 the local glassmakers' guild made rules to help preserve glassmaking secrets. It was forbidden to divulge trade secrets outside of Venice. If a glassworker left the city without permission, he would be ordered to return. (Note: While the Murano glassmakers were typically men, records exist beginning in the 1400s of women working in the manufacture of glass in Murano. A record from 1446 describes the employment of a woman who decorated glass and worked for Salvatore Barovier.) If he failed to return, his family would be imprisoned. If he still did not return, an assassin would be sent to kill him. Additional rules specified ingredients used for making glass and the type of wood used as fuel for the furnaces.

=== Island of Murano ===
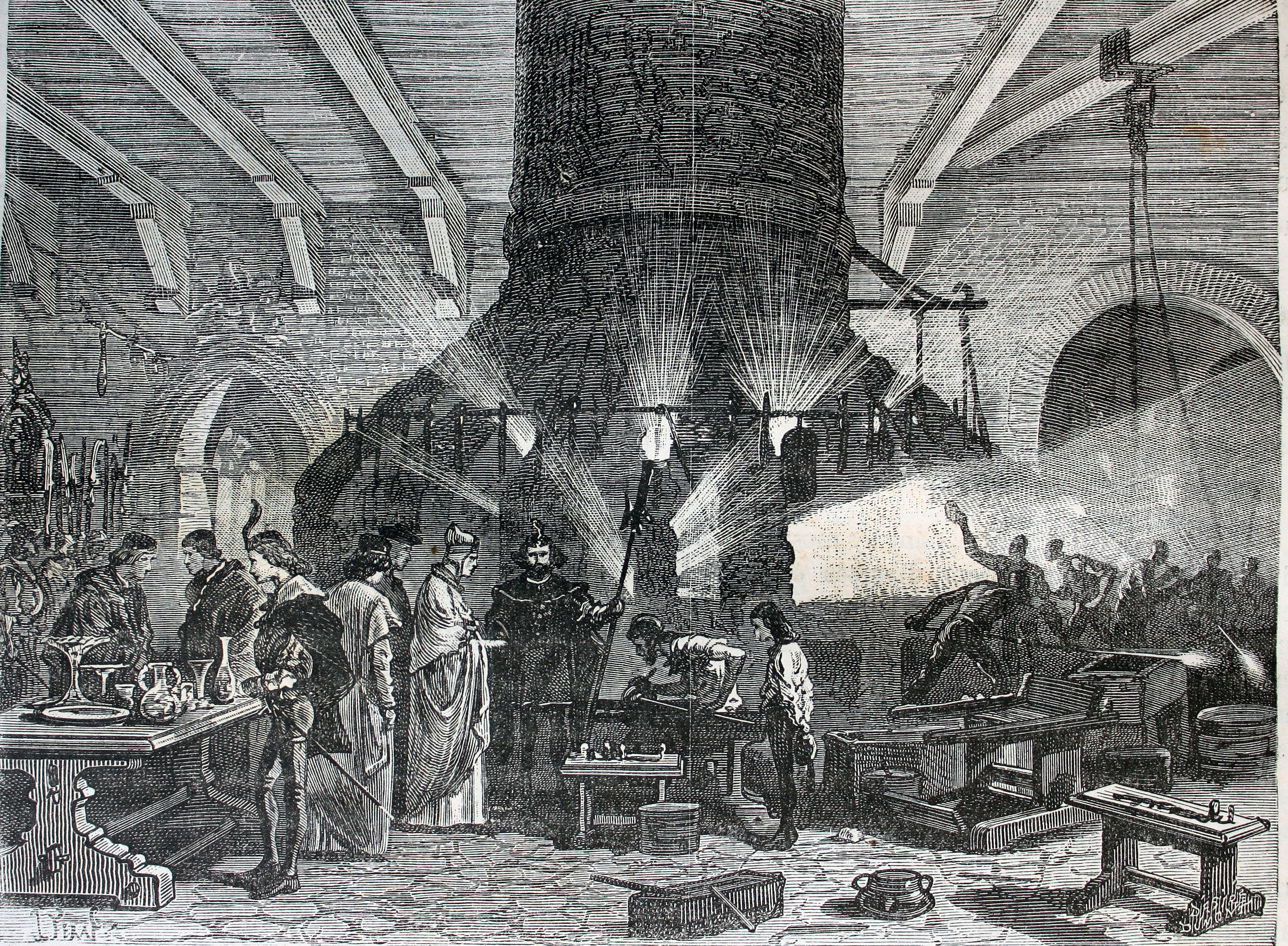
The Doge visits Murano

A law dated November 8, 1291 confined most of Venice's glassmaking industry to the "island of Murano". (Note: The edict was modified to allow manufacturers of small wares to remain in Venice provided their works was separated from other buildings by at least fifteen paces.) Murano is actually a cluster of islands linked by short bridges, located less than 2 kilometres (1.2 mi) north of the Venetian mainland in the Venetian lagoon. (Note: Dugan and Shotwell describe Murano as a group of small islands connected by bridges. The official Murano glass shop says Murano is 1.5 kilometres (0.93 mi) from Venice.) The furnaces used to make molten glass were a fire hazard, especially in cities with wooden structures nearby. Moving the glassmaking industry to Murano removed the threat of a disastrous fire in Venice. The move also kept the technology of glassmaking, and the glassmakers, confined to Murano. This prevented the spread of Venetian glassmaking expertise to potential competitors. Glassmakers were not allowed to leave the island without permission from the government. Leaving without permission, or revealing trade secrets, was punishable by death. Locating the industry on a single island also made it easier for the government to monitor imports and exports.

Murano in the 1200s was a summer resort where the aristocrats of Venice built villas with orchards and gardens. It took about an hour to row a boat from Venice to Murano. Although the glassmakers could not leave the island, the nobles had no such constraints. Despite their travel restrictions, the glassmakers lived on a beautiful island, were under the direct rule of Venice's Council of Ten (the Venetian state-security committee), and had extra privileges. They did not work during the hot summer, during which furnace repair and maintenance was performed. During the 1300s, the annual summer vacation lasted five months. In the 1400s, the Venetian government shortened the summer vacation to three and a half months. Murano glassmakers sometimes complained they were not working enough. (Note: In the 1540s, the Murano glassmakers were unhappy with the 35-week work year, complaining that they did not get enough time to work—contrary to typical complaints of too much work.) Glassmakers also enjoyed heightened social status. On December 22, 1376, it was announced that if a glassmaker's daughter married a nobleman, there was no forfeiture of social class, so their children were nobles.

== Major products and innovations ==
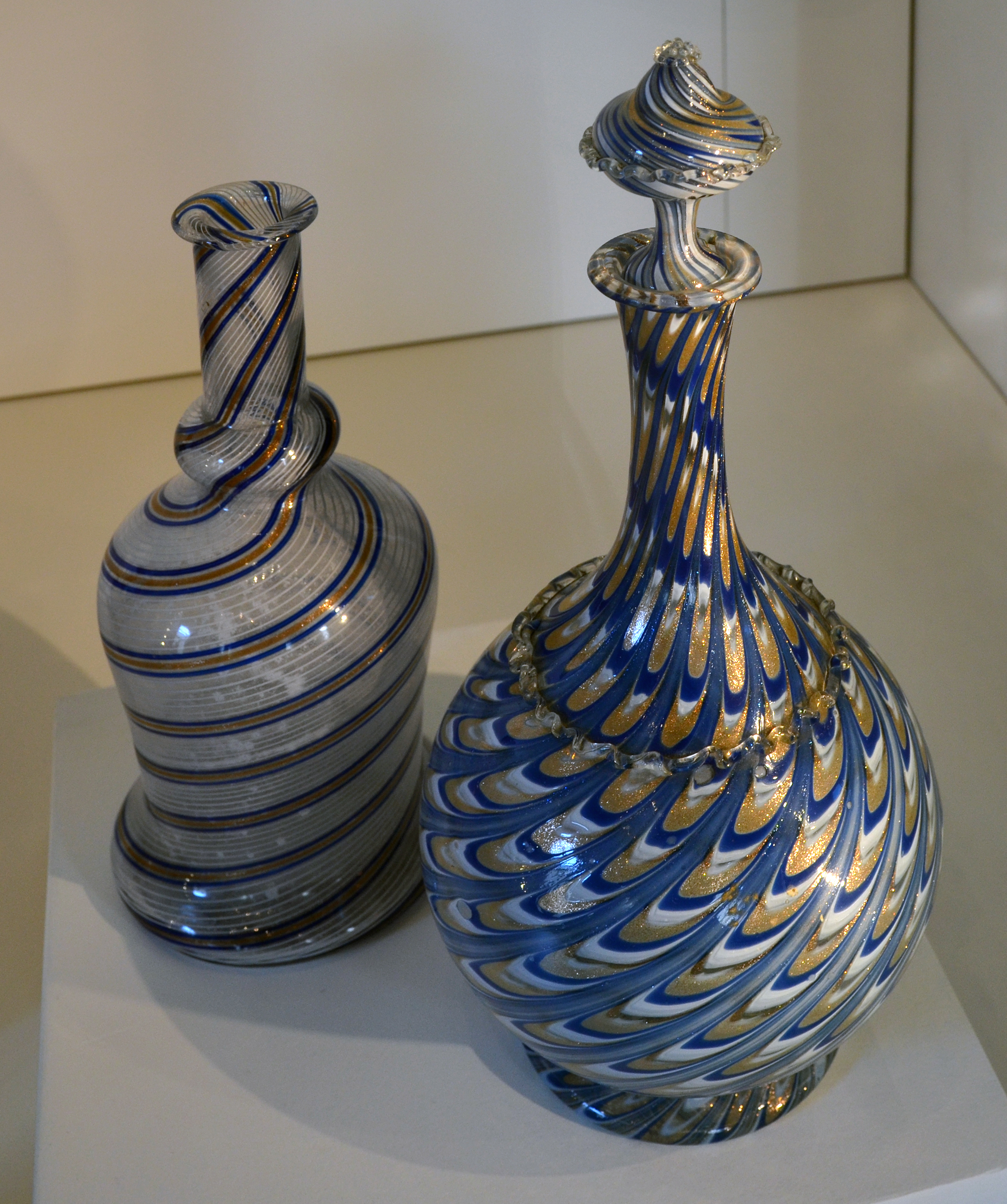
Carafes containing aventurine glass thread

The Venetian glassmakers of Murano are known for many innovations and refinements to glassmaking. Among them are Murano beads, cristallo, lattimo, chandeliers, and mirrors. Additional refinements or creations are goldstone, multicolored glass (millefiori), and imitation gemstones made of glass. In addition to guarding their secret processes and glass recipes, Venetian/Murano glassmakers strived for beauty with their glass.

=== Aventurine ===
Aventurine glass, also known as goldstone glass, is translucent brownish with metallic (copper) specks. It was developed by Venetian glassmakers in the early 15th century. It is first cited in historical documents in 1626. The name aventurine is used because it was discovered accidentally.

=== Beads ===
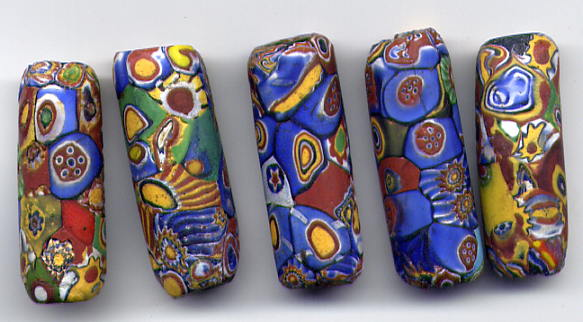
Millefiori beads

Glass beads (a.k.a. Murano beads) were made by the Venetians beginning in the 1200s. The beads were used as rosary beads and jewelry. They were also popular in Africa. Christopher Columbus noted that the people of the New World (Native Americans) were "delighted" with the beads as gifts, and beads became popular with American Indians.

=== Calcedonio ===
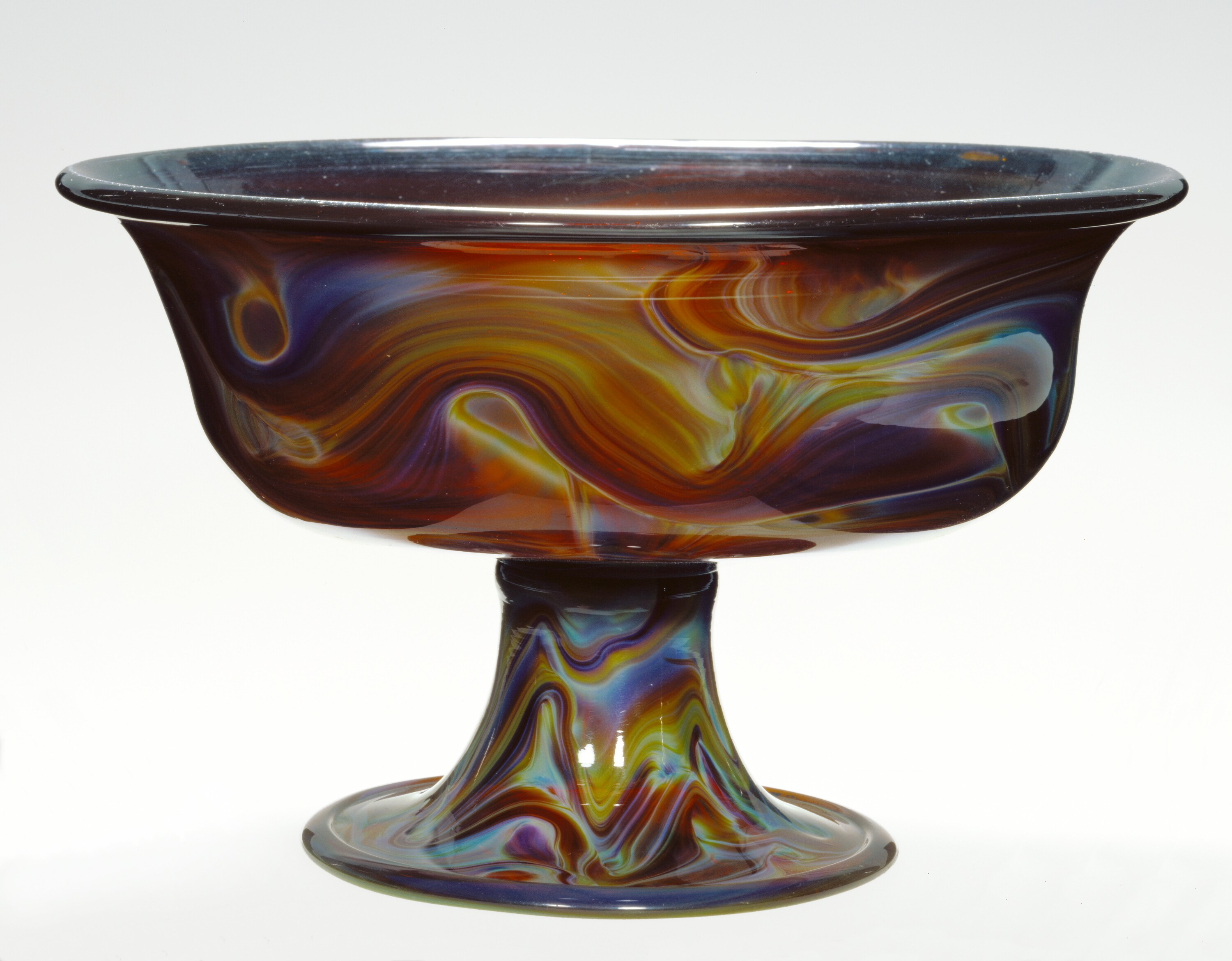
Venetian glass Calcedonio about 1500 unknown artist

Calcedonio is a marbled glass that looked like the semiprecious stone chalcedony. This type of glass was created during the 1400s by Angelo Barovier, who is considered Murano's greatest glassmaker. Barovier was an expert glassblower, revived enameling, and also worked with colored glass. His family had been involved with glassmaking since at least 1331, and the family continued in the business after his death. He died in 1460. (Note: At least three authors agree that Angelo Barovier died in 1460. The date of his birth is less certain, but is said to be around 1400.)

=== Chandeliers ===
During the 1700s, Giuseppe Briati was famous for his work with ornamented mirrors and chandeliers. Briati's chandelier style was called ciocche—literally bouquet of flowers. Briati's typical chandelier was large with multiple arms decorated with garlands, flowers and leaves. One of the common uses of the huge Murano chandeliers was interior lighting for theatres and important rooms in palaces. Briati was born in Murano in 1686, and his family's business was glassmaking. He was allowed to work in a Bohemian glass factory, where he learned the secrets of working with Bohemian crystal—which was becoming more popular than Murano cristallo (Italian for crystal). In 1739, the Council of Ten allowed him to move his furnace from Murano to Venice because his work had caused such jealousy that he and his workers feared for their lives. (His father had been stabbed to death in 1701.) Briati retired in 1762, and his nephew became manager of the glass works. Briati died in Venice in 1772, and is buried in Murano.

=== Cristallo ===
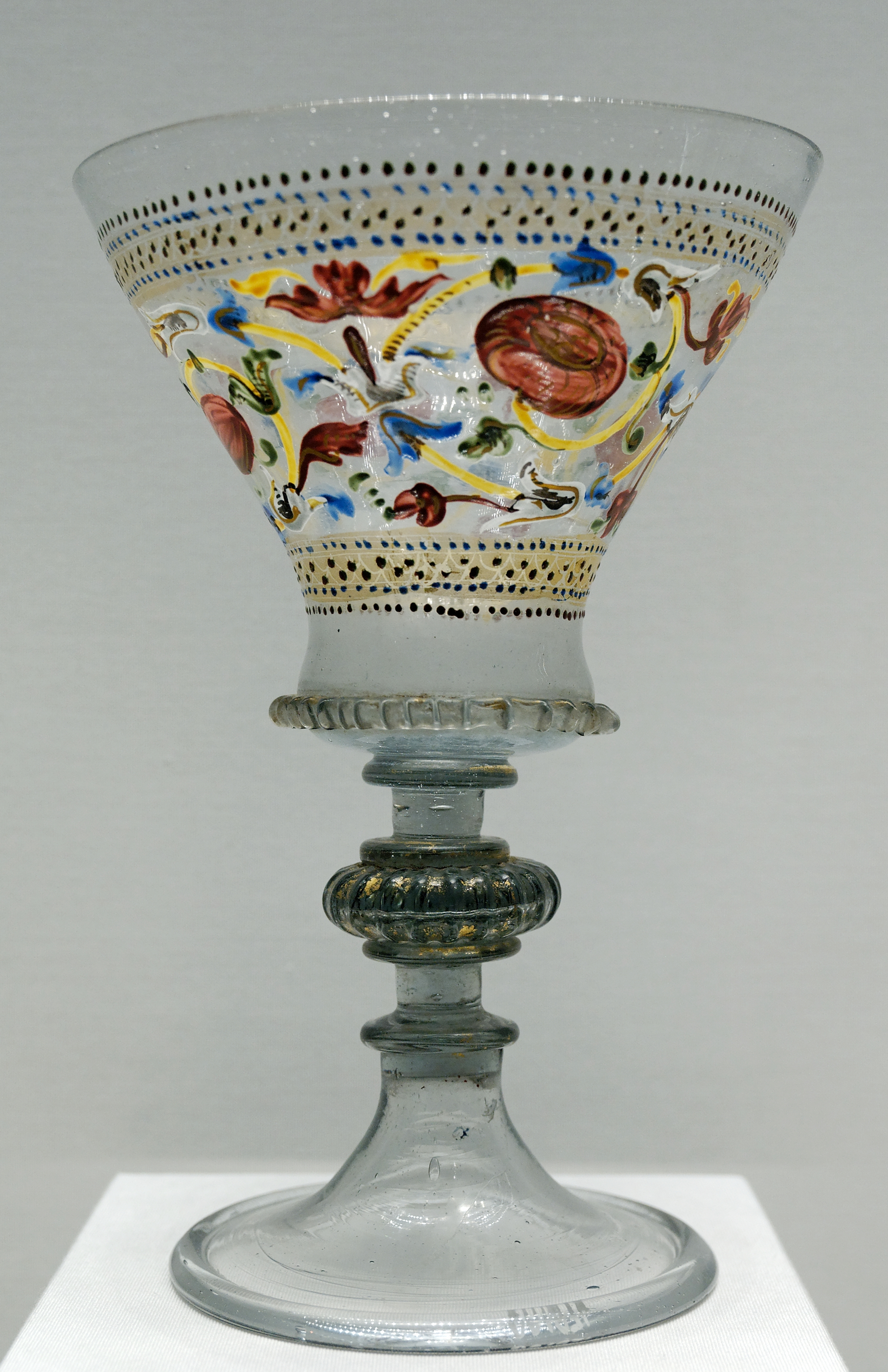
Enameled cristallo stem glass, around 1500

Cristallo is a soda glass, created during the 15th century by Murano's Angelo Barovier. (Note: Angelo Barovier is generally credited with creating cristallo, and was definitely making it in 1455. One set of authors believes that cristallo was an incremental "development that stretched over nearly two centuries." They speculate that Barovier perfected the soda ash purification process used for cristallo, and also discovered the stabilizer.) The oldest reference to cristallo is dated May 24, 1453. At the time, cristallo was considered Europe's clearest glass, and is one of the main reasons Murano became "the most important glass center". The name arose because it looked like rock crystal or clear quartz, which had long been carved into various types of vessels and small hardstone carvings. Rock crystal was said to have magical qualities and in the Middle Ages was often used in Christian religious objects. Cristallo became very popular.

Cristallo was fragile and difficult to cut, but it could be enameled and engraved. Manganese dioxide, a de-coloring agent, was a key ingredient in the secret formula used to make cristallo. An easy modification to cristallo made in Murano was to produce a frosted or crackle version. The use of "crystal" as a marketing term for glass has continued into modern times, though for at least the last century it has normally meant lead crystal glass of the type developed by Ravenscroft. Cristallo could be made extremely thin, thus reducing the remaining hint of color, and the Venetians usually made clear pieces this way.

=== Filigrana ===
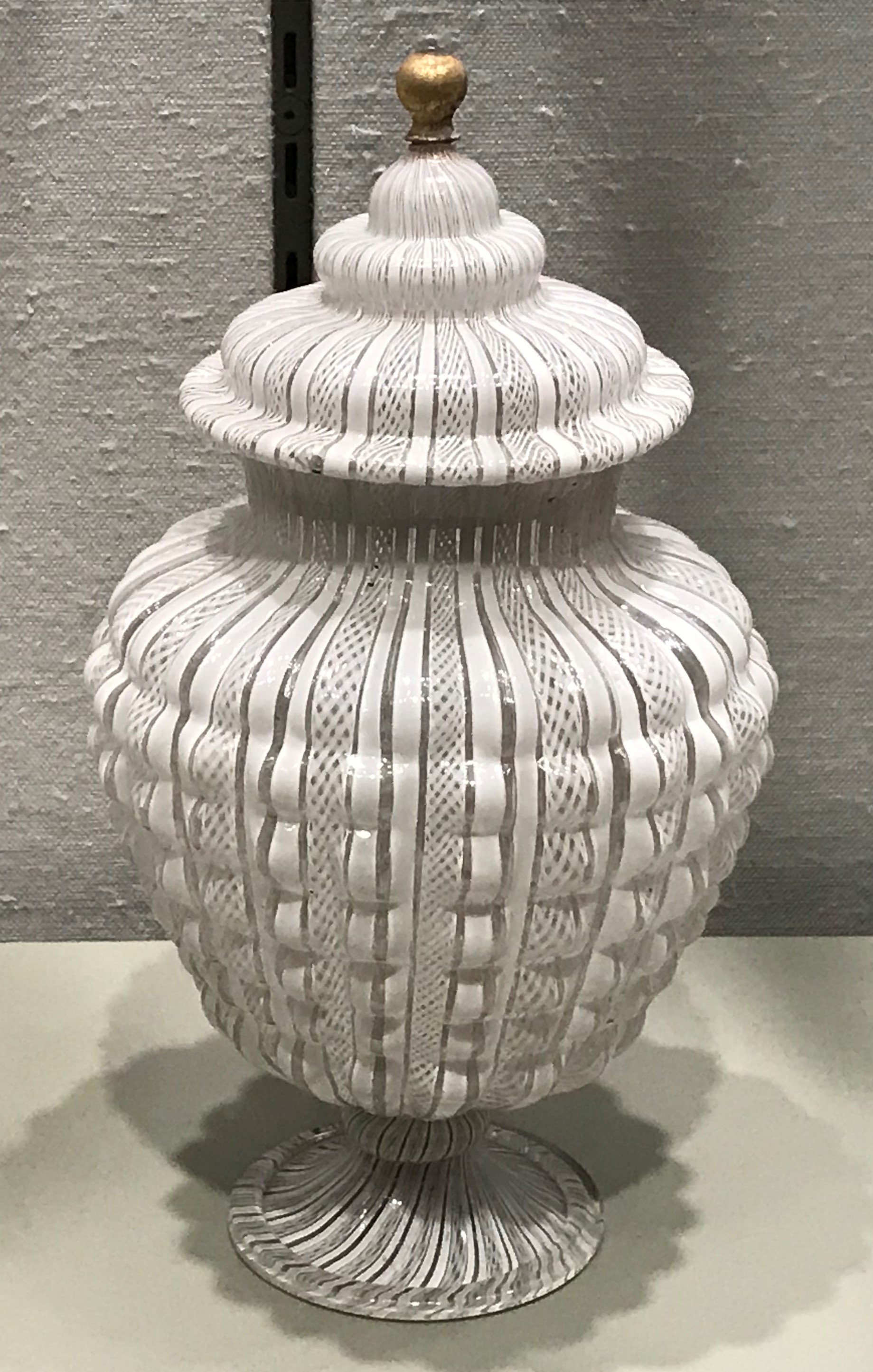
Filigree style jar

The filigrana (a.k.a. filigree) style was developed in Murano in the 1500s. By embedding glass canes (usually white but not always) in colorless glass, the glassware has a striped appearance. Vetro a fili has straight white stripes, vetro a retortoli has twisted or spiral patterns, and vetro a reticello has two sets of lines twisted in opposite directions. Francesco Zeno has been mentioned as the inventor of vetro a retortoli.

=== Lattimo ===
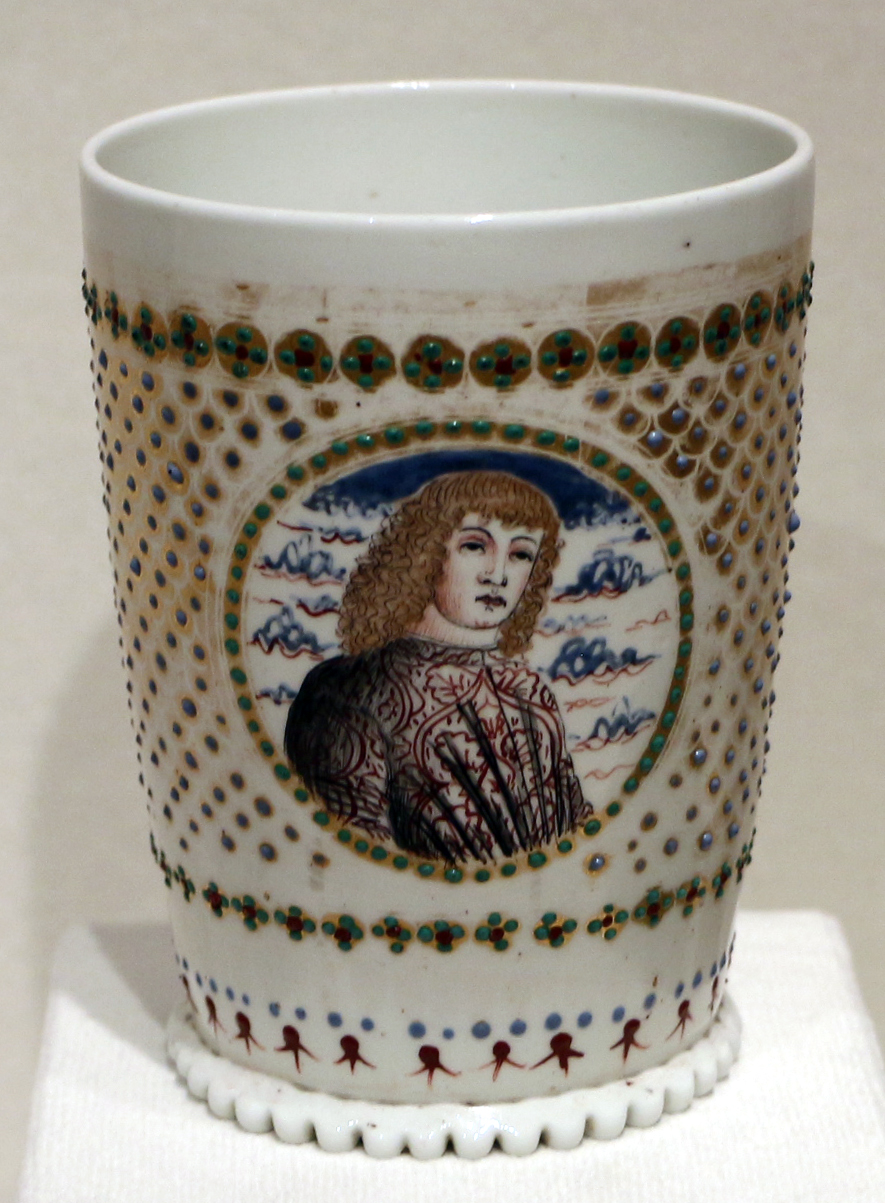
Enameled lattimo glass

Lattimo, or milk glass, began being made in Murano during the 15th century, and Angelo Barovier is credited with its re-discovery and development. This glass is opaque white, and was meant to resemble enameled porcelain. It was often decorated with enamel showing sacred scenes or views of Venice.

=== Millefiori ===
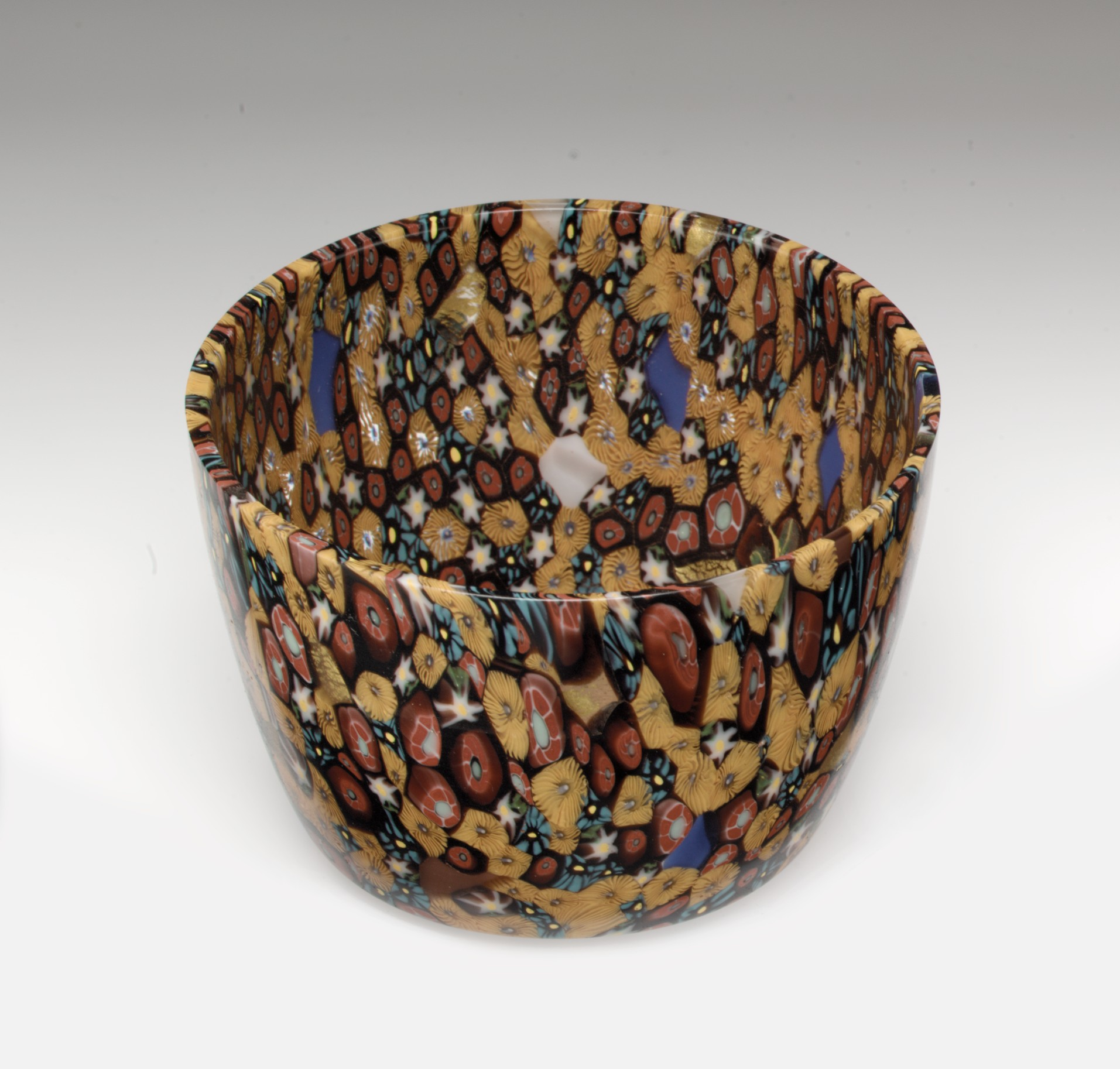
Millefiori bowl circa 1870s

Millefiori glass is a variation of the murrine technique made from colored canes in clear glass, and is often arranged in flower-like patterns. The Italian word millefiori means thousand flowers. This technique was perfected in Alexandria, Egypt, and began being used in Murano in the 15th century.

=== Mirrors ===
Small mirrors were made in Murano beginning in the 1500s, and mirror makers had their own guild beginning in 1569. Murano mirrors were known for the artwork on the frame that held the mirror in addition to their quality. By the 1600s, Murano mirrors were in great demand. However, by the end of the century, English-made mirrors had the best quality. Only one glass house in Murano was still making mirrors by 1772.

=== Murrine ===
Murrine technique begins with the layering of colored liquid glass, heated to 1,040 °C (1,900 °F), which is then stretched into long rods called canes. When cooled, these canes are then sliced in cross-sections, which reveals the layered pattern. Ercole Barovier, a descendant of Murano's greatest glassmaker Angelo Barovier, won numerous awards during the 1940s and 1950s for his innovations using the murrine technique.

=== Sommerso ===
Sommerso ("submerged" in Italian), is a form of artistic Murano glass that has layers of different colors (typically two), which are formed by dipping colored glass into another molten glass and then blowing the combination into a desired shape. The outermost layer, or casing, is often clear. Sommerso was developed in Murano during the late 1930s. Flavio Poli was known for using this technique, and it was made popular by Seguso Vetri d'Arte and the Mandruzzato family in the 1950s. This process is a popular technique for vases, and is sometimes used for sculptures.

=== Spectacles ===
Eyeglasses are thought to have been invented in Italy; with Pisa, Venice, and Florence discussed as the location of the invention. Almost from the invention of eyeglasses sometime late in the thirteenth century, Venice was an important hub for the manufacturing of spectacle lenses.

== Golden age, decline, and revival ==
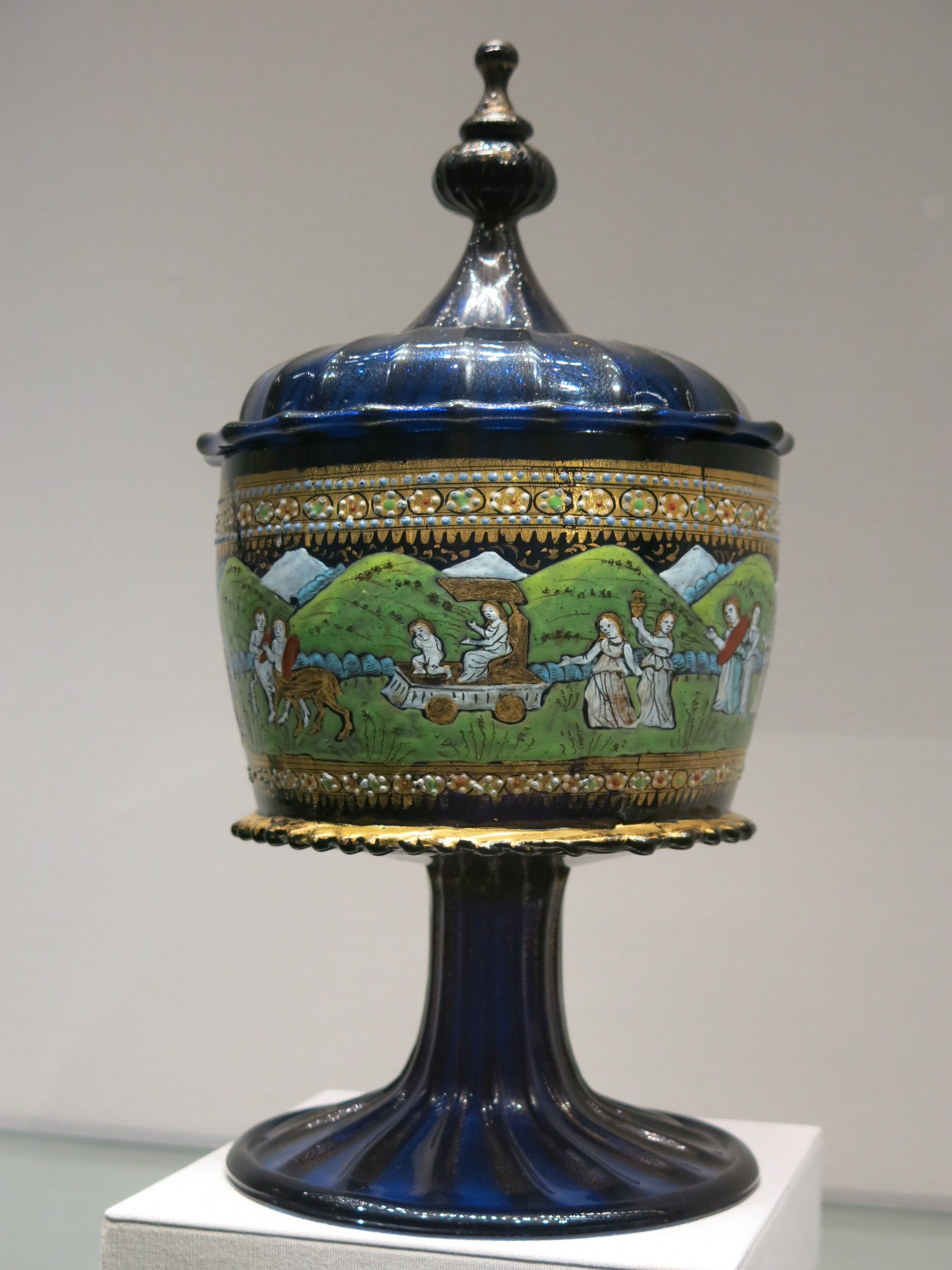
Barovier enameled glass

The 16th century was the golden age for Venetian glassmaking in Murano. Major trading partners included the Spanish Indies, Italy, Spain, Ottoman Turkey, and the German-speaking states. At least 28 glassmaking furnaces were in Murano in 1581. Numerous leaders and dignitaries visited Murano during this century, including the queen of France, dukes, princes, generals, cardinals, archbishops, and ambassadors. Collectors of Murano glass included Henry VIII of England, Pope Clement VII, Emperor Ferdinand I, Francis I of France, and Philip II of Spain.

During the 16th century Murano glassmakers liberated themselves from the imitation of metalwork shapes, which had previously been their habit. Shapes became elongated and elegant, "then more elaborate and inclining to fantasy", for example in the hot-work pieces added to the sides of the stems of glasses. The glass was extremely thin, and therefore fragile, adding to the effect of luxury.

In 1612 the Florentine priest Antonio Neri published L'Arte Vetraria (The Art of Glass), which revealed all the secrets of Venetian glass production to the outside world, and by the later 16th century the efforts of the Venetian Republic to hold on to its virtual monopoly in the production of luxury glass, mainly by keeping skilled workers in the republic, were beginning to fail. Other countries, often led by their monarchs, were keen to have their own fine glass industries, and tempted skilled workers away. This led to a diffusion of the Venetian style to many centres around Europe. The glass made in this movement is called façon de Venise (French for "Venetian style"); the quality is typically rather lower than the Venetian originals, partly from difficulties sourcing the right materials, and the place of manufacture is often hard to discern. Engraved glass was a part of this diffusion, and initially was especially developed in Germany.

Eventually, the dominance of cristallo came to an end. In 1673, English glass merchant George Ravenscroft created a clear glass he called crystalline—but it was not stable. Three years later, he improved this glass by adding lead oxide, and lead glass (a.k.a. crystal) was created. Ravenscroft, who had lived for many years in Venice, made lead crystal that was less breakable than cristallo. In 1674, Bohemian glassmaker Louis le Vasseur d'Ossimont (1629–1689) made crystal that was similar to Ravenscroft's. In 1678, Johan Friedrich Kunkel von Lowenstein produced a cristallo-like glass in Potsdam. The Bohemian and Prussian-style glass was later modified by the addition of lime and chalk. This new glass is attributed to Bohemian glassmaker Michael Müller in 1683. It had a tendency to crizzle at first, but the problem had been solved by 1714. The Bohemian glass was not suitable to the Murano-style artwork on the glass. However, this harder glass was produced as a thicker glass suitable for glass engraving and grinding. The Bohemian and English glass eventually became more popular than cristallo made in Murano. By the 1700s, Murano glass was traded mostly with Italian states and the Turkish empire. Small quantities were traded with England, Flanders, the Netherlands and Spain.

Napoleon conquered Venice during May 1797, and the Venetian Republic came to an end. The fall of the Venetian Republic caused hard times for glassmaking in Murano, and some of the Murano methods became lost. Controlled by France and Austria, Venetian glassmaking became unprofitable because of tariffs and taxes—and glassmakers that survived were reduced to making mostly beads. Napoleon closed the Venetian glass factories in 1807, although simple glassware and beadmaking continued. In the 1830s, outsiders tried to revive the industry. However, it was not until Venice became part of Italy in 1866 that Murano glassmaking could experience a revival. Around that time, local leaders such as the mayor of Murano Antonio Colleoni and Abbot Vincenzo Zanetti (founder of the Murano Glass Museum), along with Murano manufacturers such as Fratelli Toso, began reinventing the earlier Murano techniques for making glass. Antonio Salviati, a Venetian lawyer who gave up his profession in 1859 in order to devote his time to glassmaking, also had an important role in the revival of glassmaking in Murano.

== Making glass ==
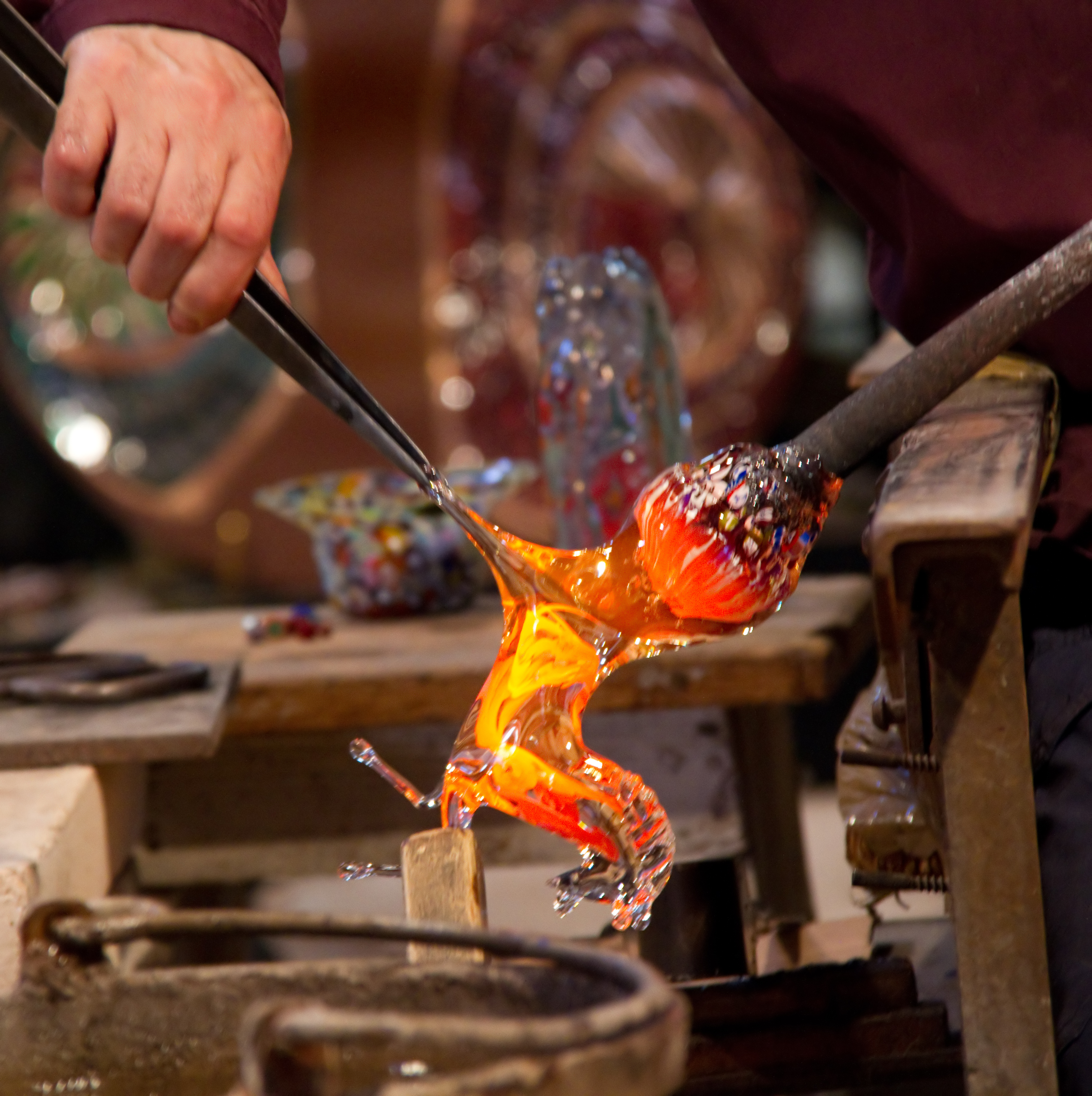
Glassmaking tools holding a glass horse being shaped

From its beginning until the fall of the Venetian Republic, Murano glass was mostly a very high quality soda–lime glass (using today's terminology) that had extra attention focused on its appearance. Glass from that time typically contained 65 to 70 percent silica. A flux, usually soda (sodium oxide as 10 to 20 percent of the glass composition) was added to enable the silica to melt at a lower temperature. A stabilizer, usually lime (calcium oxide as about 10 percent of the glass) was also added for durability and to prevent solubility in water. Small quantities of other ingredients were added to the glass, mostly to affect appearance. Sand is a common source for silica. For certain types of glass, the Murano glassmakers used quartz as their source for silica. Quartz pebbles were crushed into a fine powder. Two sources for sand were Crete and Sicily. Quartz pebbles were selected from the Ticino and Adige rivers in Northern Italy. Their source for soda was what they called allume catina—plant ash found in the eastern Mediterranean countries of the Middle East. Beginning in the 16th century, allume catina was also imported from Mediterranean coastal regions of Spain and France.

The mixing and melting of the batch of ingredients was a two-stage process. First, nearly equal amounts of silica and flux were continuously stirred in a special furnace. The furnace was called a calchera furnace, and the mix was called fritta. In the second stage, the fritta was mixed with selected recycled waste glass (cullet) and melted in another furnace. Depending on the type and color of glass, other additives were used. Lead and tin were added for white opaque glass (latimo). Cobalt was used for blue glass. Copper and iron were used for green and for various shades of green, blue, and yellow. Manganese was used to remove colors. Although natural gas is the furnace fuel of choice for glassmaking today, the fuel mandated in Murano during the 13th century was alder and willow wood. During this second stage, the surface of the molten glass was skimmed to remove undesirable chemicals that affected the appearance of the glass. Additional techniques were used as glassmaking evolved. To improve clarity, molten glass was put in water and then re-melted. Another technique was to purify the flux by boiling and filtering.

=== Tools ===
The Venetian glassmakers had a set of tools that changed little for hundreds of years. A ferro sbuso, also called a canna da soffio, is the blowpipe essential for extracting molten glass and beginning the shaping process. (Note: Ferro sbuso comes from the Muranese language, where adding an "S" at the beginning of a noun (substantive) turns it into a verb or an adjective.) A borselle is a tong-like tool of various sizes used to shape glass that has not hardened. A borselle puntata is a similar tool, only it has a pattern that can be imprinted on the glass. A pontello is the pontil, an iron rod that holds the glass while work is done on the edge of the glass. A tagianti is a large scissors used to cut glass before it has hardened. A scagno is the workbench used by the glassmaker. "Good tools are nice, but good hands are better", is an old Murano saying that reinforces the idea that the glassmakers of Murano rely on their skills instead of any advantage caused by special tools.

== Today ==
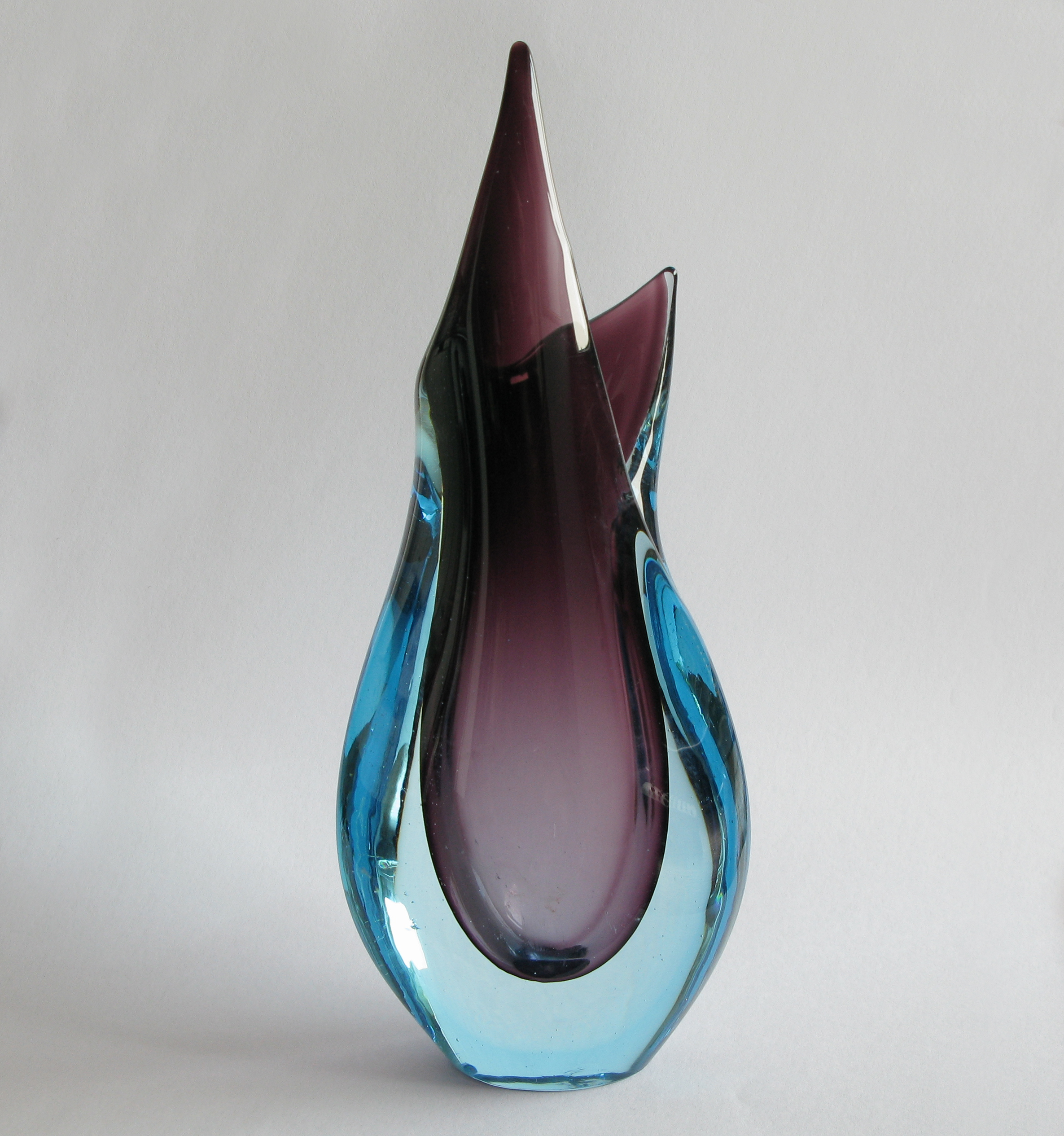
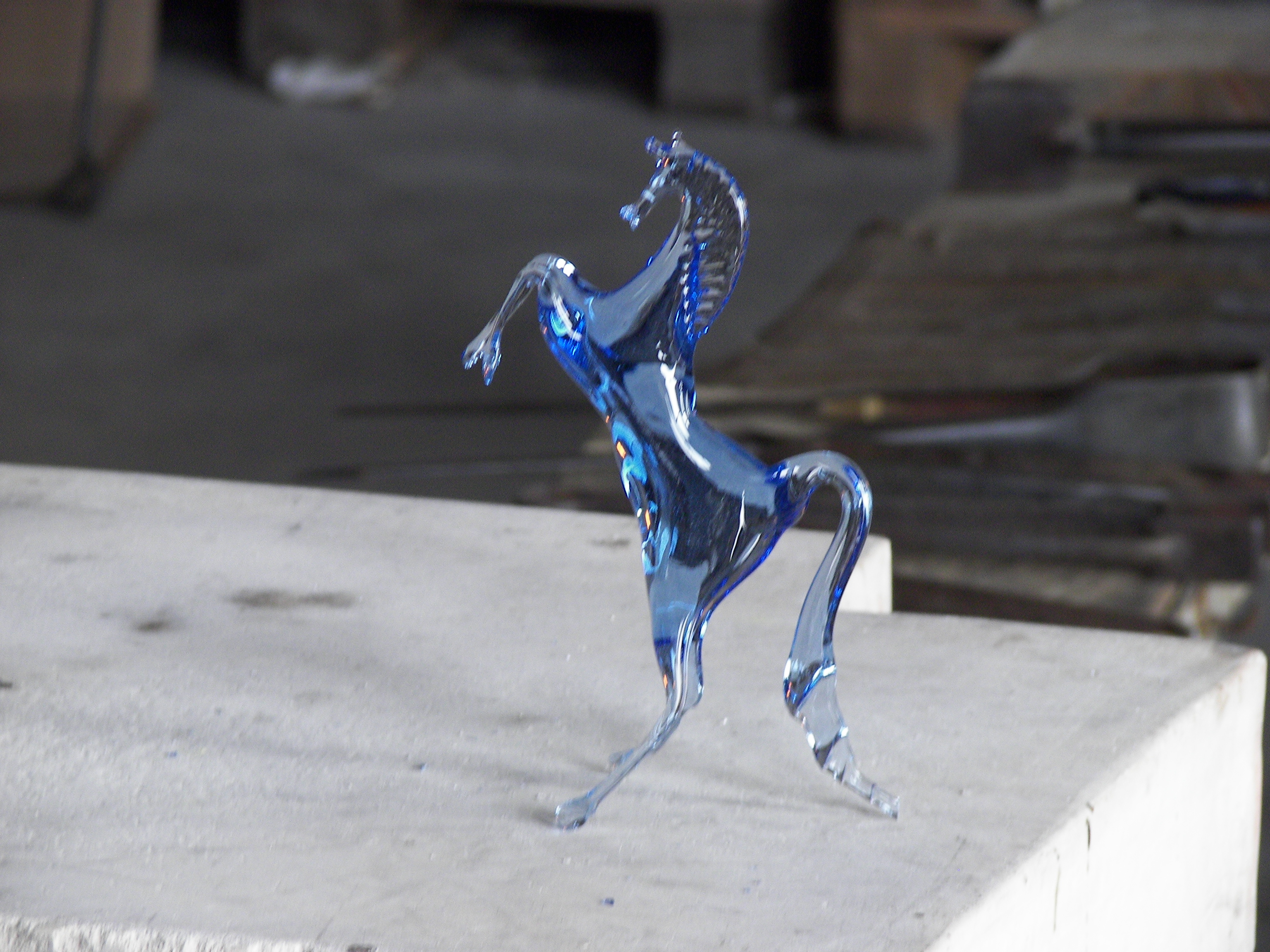
Modern Murano glass

Some of Venice's historical glass factories in Murano remain well known brands today, including De Biasi, Gabbiani, Venini, Salviati, Barovier & Toso, Pauly, Berengo Studio, Seguso, Formia International, Simone Cenedese, Alessandro Mandruzzato, Vetreria Ducale, Estevan Rossetto 1950 and others. The oldest glass factory is Antica Vetreria Fratelli Toso, founded in 1854.

Overall, the industry has been shrinking as demand has waned. Imitation works (recognizable by experts but not by the typical tourist) from Asia and Eastern Europe take an estimated 40 to 45 percent of the market for Murano glass, and public tastes have changed while the designs in Murano have largely stayed the same. To fight the imitation problem, a group of companies and concerned individuals created a trademark in 1994 that certifies that the product was made on Murano. By 2012, about 50 companies were using the Artistic Glass Murano trademark of origin.

Glassmaking is a difficult and uncomfortable profession, as glassmakers must work with a product heated to extremely high temperatures. Unlike 500 years ago, children of glassmakers do not enjoy any special privileges, extra wealth, or marriage into nobility. Today, it is difficult to recruit young glassmakers. Foreign imitations, and difficulty attracting young workers, caused the number of professional glassmakers in Murano to decrease from about 6,000 in 1990 to fewer than 1,000 by 2012.

=== Alaska ===
In February 2021, Venetian glass trade beads were announced to have been found at three prehistoric Inuit sites in Alaska, including Punyik Point. Uninhabited today, and located a mile from the Continental Divide in the Brooks Range, the area was on ancient trade routes from the Bering Sea to the Arctic Ocean. The researchers believed the likely route these artifacts traveled from their creation in Venice was across Europe, then Eurasia and finally over the Bering Strait, making this discovery "the first documented instance of the presence of indubitable European materials in prehistoric sites in the western hemisphere as the result of overland transport across the Eurasian continent." From radiocarbon dating materials found near the beads, archaeologists estimated their arrival on the continent to sometime between 1440 and 1480, predating Christopher Columbus. The dating and provenance has however been challenged by other researchers who point out that such beads were first made in Venice in the mid-16th century, and that an early 17th-century French origin is also possible.

== See also ==
- Caneworking
- Fondazione Musei Civici di Venezia
- Millefleur
- Murano Glass Museum
- Murrine
- Made in Italy

== Notes ==
=== References ===
- Battie, David and Cottle, Simon, eds., Sotheby's Concise Encyclopedia of Glass, 1991, Conran Octopus, ISBN 978-1-85029-654-6
- Chambers, Karen S.; Oldknow, Tina; Ft. Wayne Museum of Art; Tampa Museum of Art (1999). Clearly Inspired : Contemporary Glass and Its Origins. San Francisco: Pomegranate. p. 134. ISBN 978-0-76490-932-0. OCLC 1008387303.
- Dillon, Edward (1907). Glass. London: Methuen and Co. pp. 373. OCLC 1809307.
- Dorigato, Attilia (2003). Murano, Island of Glass. Arsenale Editrice (IT). ISBN 978-8-87743-293-3. OCLC 156146832.
- Dugan, James (2019). Capturing Venice. Walkabout photo guides.
- Edwards, Geoffery; Sommerfield, Garry; National Gallery of Victoria (1998). Art of Glass: Glass in the Collection of the National Gallery of Victoria. South Melbourne: Macmillan. p. 208. ISBN 978-0-95857-431-0. OCLC 1008129059.
- Fuga, Antonella (2006). Artists' techniques and materials. Los Angeles: J. Paul Getty Museum. p. 384. ISBN 978-0-89236-860-0. OCLC 64486684.
- Gable, Carl I. (2004). Murano Magic: Complete Guide to Venetian Glass, Its History and Artists. Atglen, Pennsylvania: Schiffer Pub. ISBN 978-0-76431-946-4. OCLC 53361383.
- Geary, Theresa Flores (2008). The Illustrated Bead Bible. New York: Sterling. ISBN 978-1-4027-2353-7.
- Hilliard, Elizabeth (2001). Chandeliers. Boston, Massachusetts: Little, Brown. ISBN 978-0-82122-768-8. OCLC 48252389.
- Hess, Catherine; Husband, Timothy; J. Paul Getty Museum (1997). European Glass in the J. Paul Getty Museum. Los Angeles: The Museum. ISBN 978-0-89236-255-4. OCLC 36549048.
- Ilardi, Vincent (2007). Renaissance Vision from Spectacles to Telescopes. Philadelphia, Pennsylvania: American Philosophical Society. ISBN 978-0-87169-259-7. OCLC 74966726.
- Janssens, Koen H. A. (2011). Modern Methods for Analyzing Archaeological and Historical Glass. Chichester, West Sussex, United Kingdom: John Wiley & Sons Inc. ISBN 978-1-11831-420-3. OCLC 1042124312.
- Madden, Thomas F. (2012). Venice: A New History. New York: Viking Penguin. ISBN 978-1-10160-113-6.
- McCray, W. Patrick (2017). Glassmaking in Renaissance Venice: The Fragile Craft. Taylor & Francis Ltd. ISBN 978-0-75460-050-3.
- Mentasti, Rosa Barovier (1997). Venetian Glass: 1890-1990. Venice: Arsenale Editrice. p. 207. ISBN 978-8-87743-119-6. OCLC 232969210.
- Moore, N. Hudson (1935). Old Glass – European and American. New York: Tudor Publishing Co. p. 394. OCLC 1189068.
- Osborne, Harold (ed), The Oxford Companion to the Decorative Arts, 1975, OUP, ISBN 0198661134
- Page, Jutta-Annette; Doménech, Ignasi (2004). Beyond Venice: Glass in Venetian Style, 1500-1750. New York: Corning Museum of Glass. p. 339. ISBN 978-0-87290-157-5. OCLC 55110404.
- Sauzay, Alexandre (1870). Marvels of Glass-Making in All Ages. London: S. Low, Son, and Marston. pp. 272. OCLC 5207106.
- Shotwell, David J. (2002). Glass A to Z. Iola, Wisconsin: Krause Publications. pp. 638. ISBN 978-0-87349-385-7. OCLC 440702171.
- Syson, Luke; Thornton, Dora (2001). Objects of Virtue : Art in Renaissance Italy. Los Angeles: J. Paul Getty Museum. p. 288. ISBN 978-0-89236-657-6. OCLC 264966212.
- Toso, Gianfranco (2000). Murano : A History of Glass. Antique Collectors Club Limited. p. 191. ISBN 978-8-87743-215-5. OCLC 449936626.
- United States Bureau of Foreign and Domestic Commerce (1917). Commerce Report. Washington, D.C.: U.S. Department of Commerce. OCLC 16914088.
- Warmus, William; Oldknow, Tina (2020). Venice and American Studio Glass. Milan: Skira.
- Weeks, Joseph D.; United States Census Office (1884). Report on the Manufacture of Glass. Washington, District of Columbia: U.S. Government Printing Office. OCLC 2123984. Archived from the original on July 16, 2023.
- Zerwick, Chloe (1990). A Short History of Glass. New York: H.N. Abrams in association with the Corning Museum of Glass. p. 112. ISBN 978-0-81093-801-4. OCLC 20220721.
