= Antonio Salviati =

Italian glass manufacturer (1816–1890)

Antonio Salviati (18 March 1816 – 25 January 1890) was an Italian glass manufacturer and founder of the Salviati family firm.

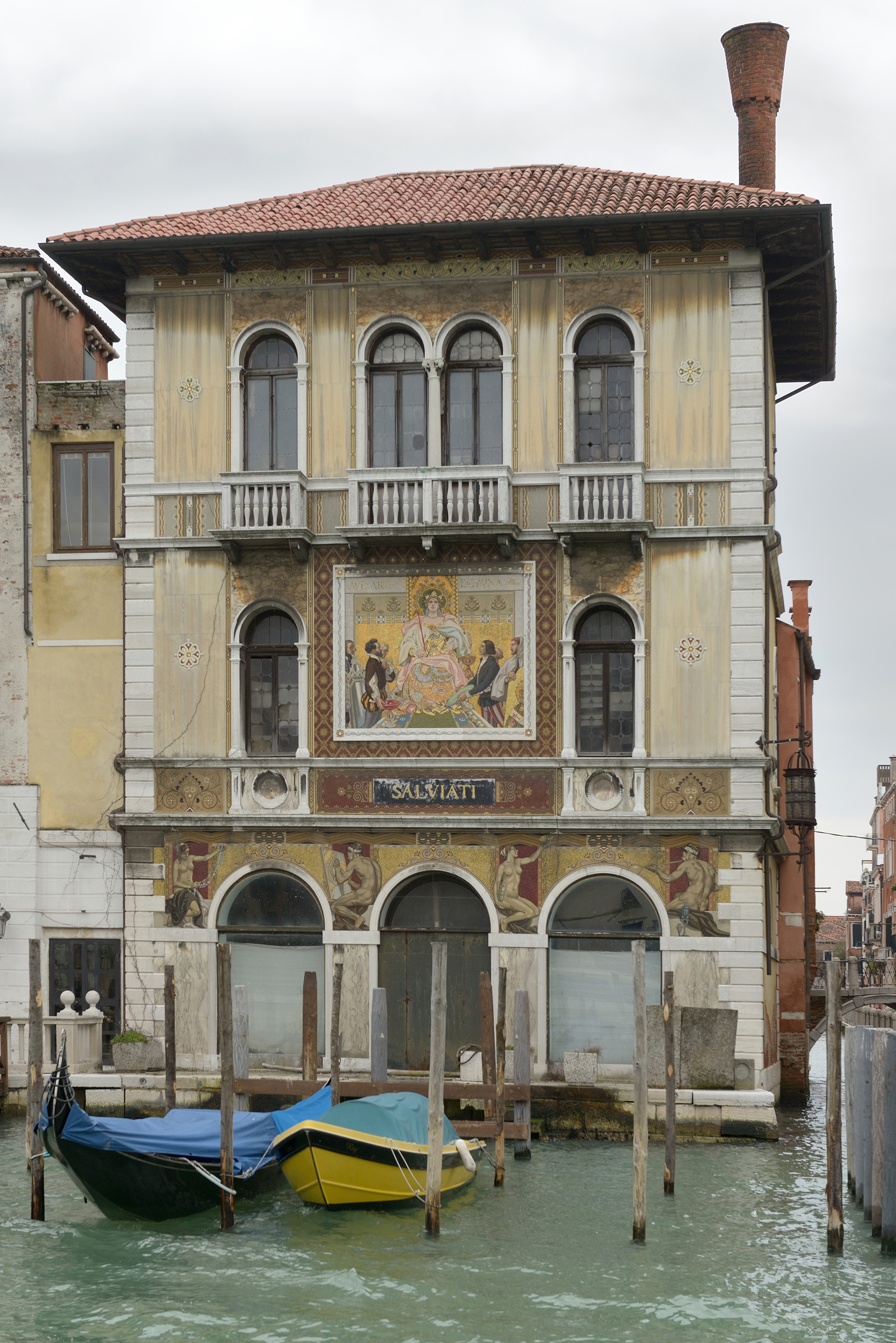
The Palazzo Salviati shop of the Salviati family in Venice

== Biography ==
A native of Vicenza, Salviati was a lawyer who became interested in glass work after participating in restorations being done on the mosaics of Saint Mark's Cathedral in Venice. He opened his first glass business in 1859 with Lorenzo Radi, and this firm produced the mosaic glass for the altar screen for the high altar of Westminster Abbey. In 1876, he left this business to establish a new firm which executed the mosaic decoration of the dome of Aachen Cathedral. The designs of this cathedral were based on the ideas of the Belgian architect Jean-Baptiste de Bethune. The Victorian period saw Salviati turn glass pieces, a former staple of wealth only enjoyed by a few, into ornamental pieces seen by millions throughout the homes and parlors of Italy.

During 1866, Antonio Salviati founded Compagnia Venezia Murano with British diplomat and archaeologist Austen Henry Layard. Pauly & C. - Compagnia Venezia Murano has continued to be an important producer of Venetian art glass.

Of particular historical relevance is the mosaic portrait of President Abraham Lincoln, which can be viewed today in the Senate House rooms in the United States, produced by Compagnia Venezia Murano and donated by Antonio Salviati in 1866.

Murano had been a centre of fine glasswork since the Middle Ages (producing the glass that bore its name), but the pieces were lavish and expensive specialty pieces that only the wealthy could afford. Salviati changed the face of the business by becoming the first glass factory owner to employ a large number of skilled workers to mass-produce glass intended for export. The Victorian period saw Salviati turn glass pieces, a former staple of wealth enjoyed by a few, into ornamental pieces seen by millions throughout the homes and parlors of Italy. This re-established Murano as a centre for glass manufacture.

Salviati died on 25 January 1890 in Venice, Italy.

== Works in Europe ==
Salviati's work spread mainly to England and France, where his work was best associated with the architectural design style of these countries. His mosaics can be seen in many churches across these countries. His smaller, mass produced work, stayed relative to Italy being sold as retail.

== Germany ==
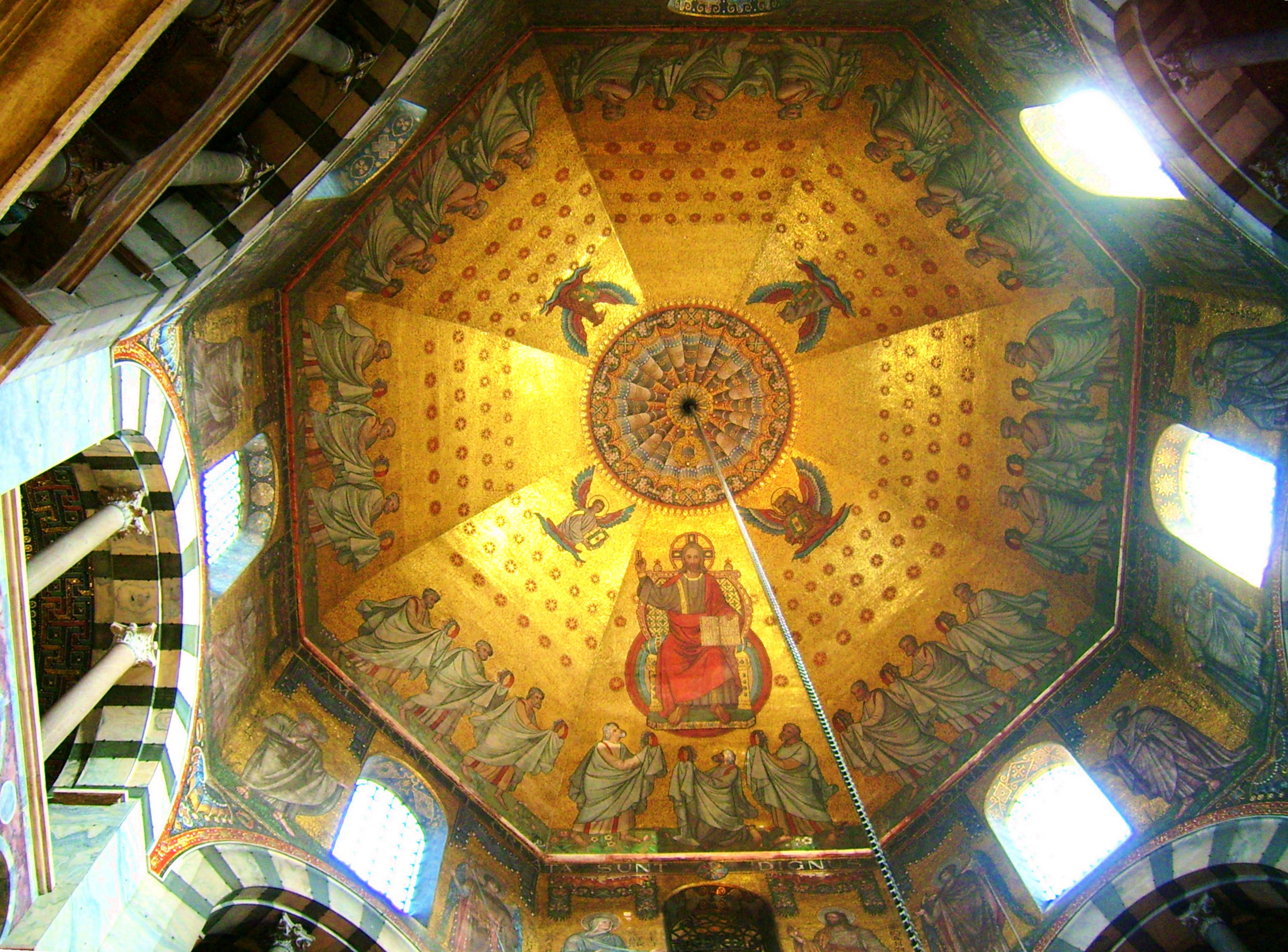
Cupola of Aachen Cathedral

- Aachen: Aachen Cathedral - cupola mosaic recreated in 1881.
- Berlin: Berlin Victory Column mosaic, 1875.
- Heringsdorf: tympanum mosaic on Villa Oeschler.

== Great Britain ==
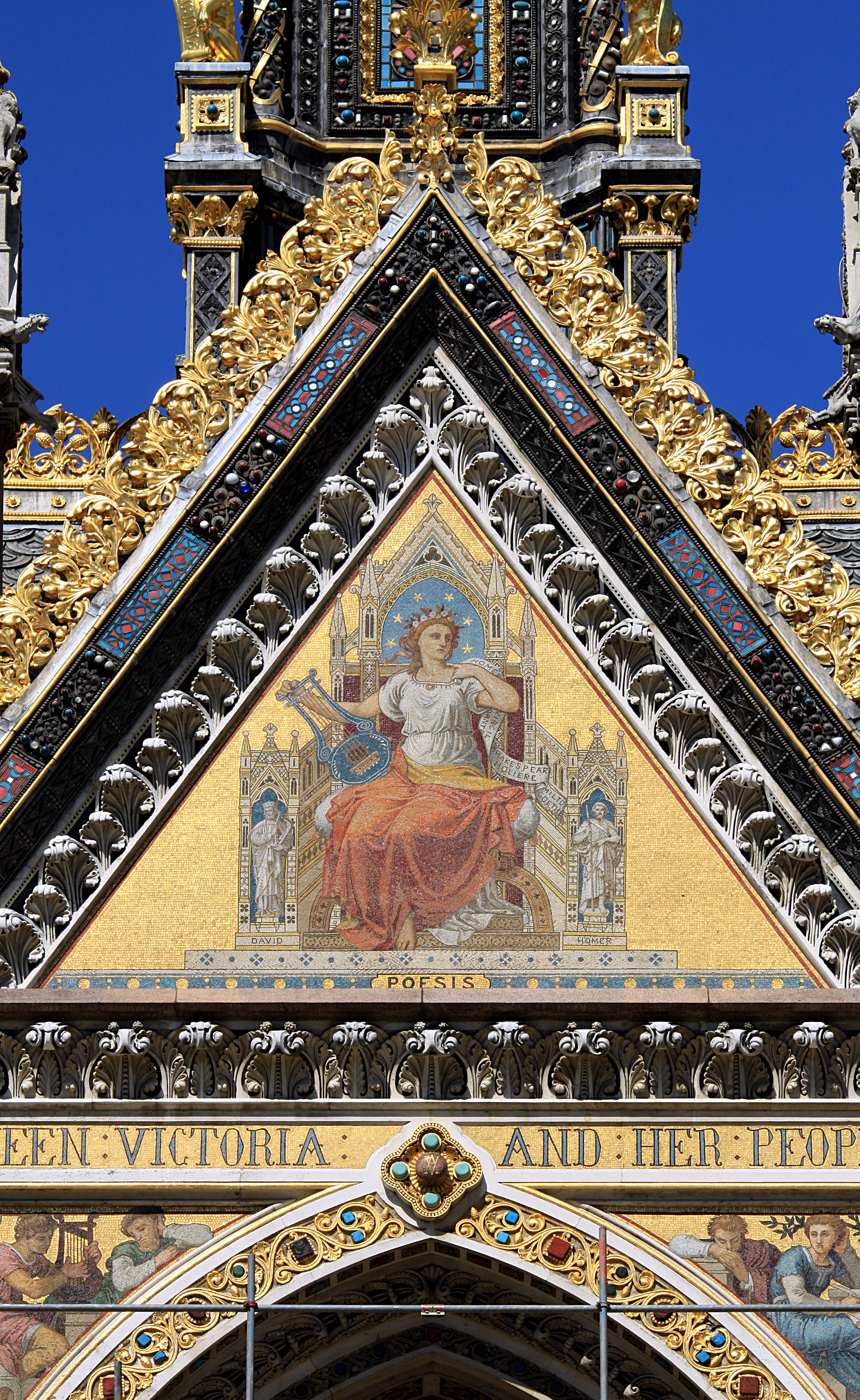
Side mosaic on the Albert Memorial

- Alloa: St John The Evangelist Scottish Episcopal Church - high altar mosaic of the Last Supper, installed 1869
- Biggleswade: Church of St Andrew - stone reredos, 1881.
- Parish Church of Canford Magna, Poole - mosaic depiction of St Mary and St Mary Magdalene 1876
- Dundee: St Paul's Cathedral - mosaic reredos of Christ in glory.
- Durham: reredos in St Mary's Church, West Rainton.
- Elsfield: St Thomas of Canterbury Church - mosaic of the Last Supper.
- Fort William: St Andrew's Episcopal Church - mosaic baptistry floor, and mosaic behind the altar depicting the Crucifixion.
- Liverpool: the Church of Saint Bridget - mosaic of the Last Supper, 1872.
- London: Albert Memorial - mosaics on side and below canopy
- London: chapel at Fulham Palace - reredos depicting the nativity.
- Reading: All Saints' Church - glass mosaic reredos depicting the Last Supper, installed 1866.
- Tamworth: Church of St Editha - high altar reredos mosaics, 1887.
- Torquay: St John's Church - chancel mosaic, installed 1866.

== Italy ==
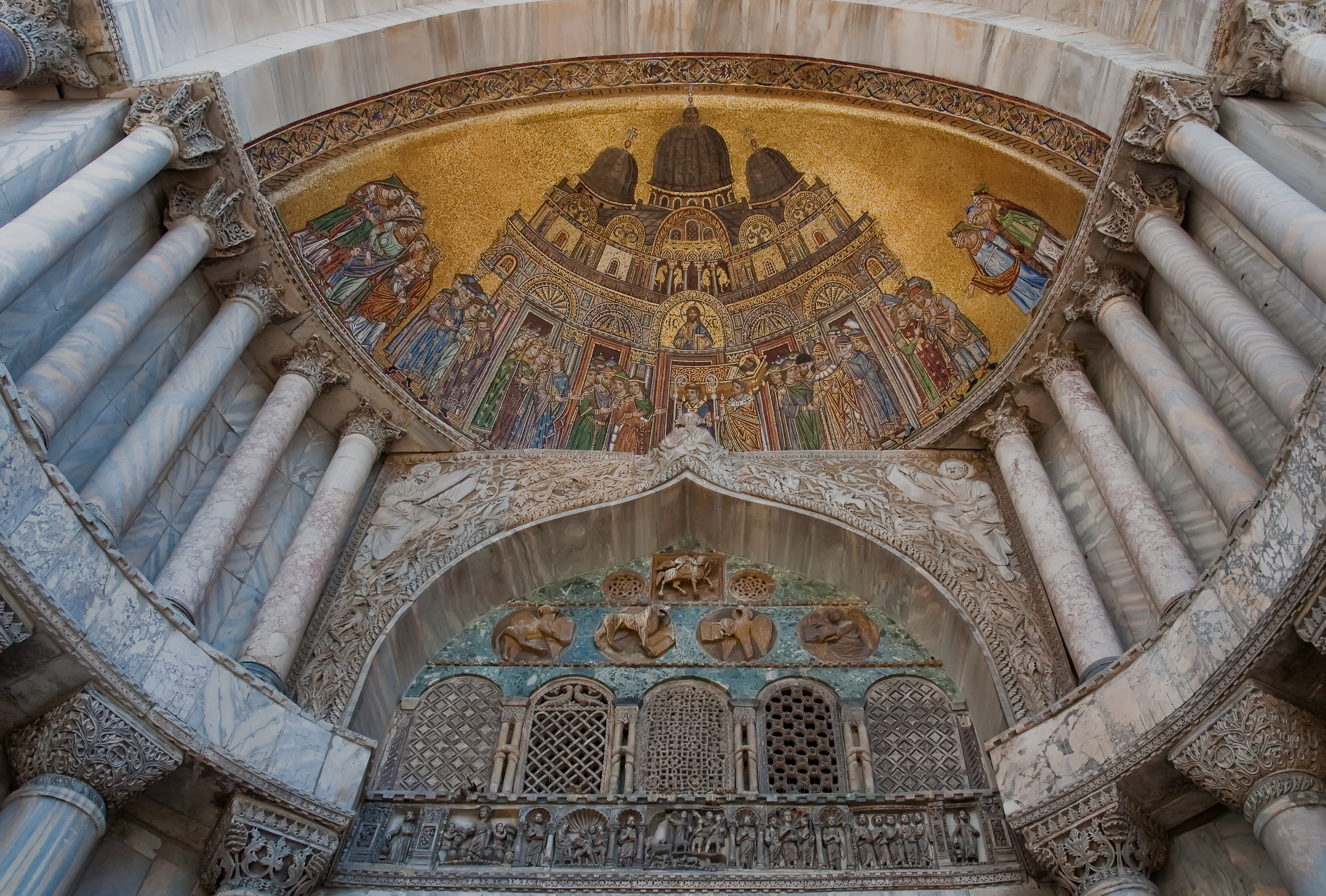
Facade mosaic above the Porta Sant'Alipio, St Mark's Basilica

- Venice: restoration of mosaics in St Mark's Basilica, started 1867.

== Poland ==
- Łódź: Karl Wilhelm Scheibler's palace, now Museum of Polish Cinematography.

== See also ==
Salviati (glassmakers)
