= Seguso =

Glass manufacturing family from Italy

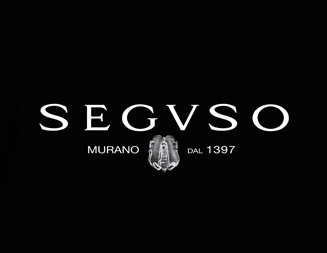

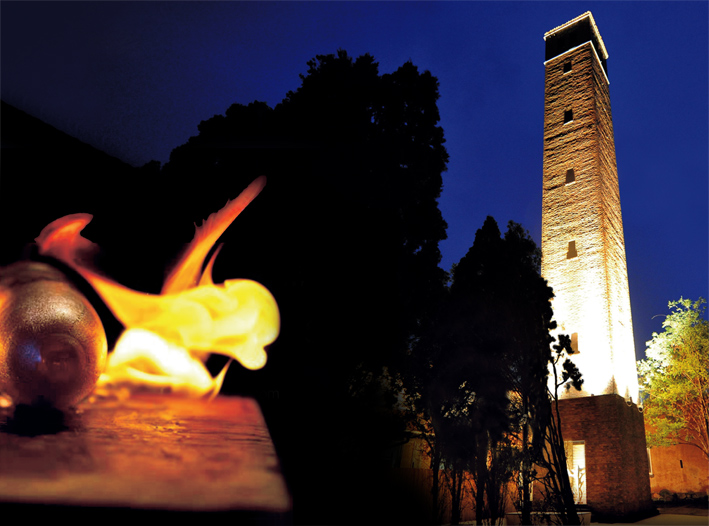
- Seguso's headquarters and glass furnace in Murano Venice, Italy
- Industry: Glassmaking
- Headquarters: Campiello San Maffio 1, Murano Venice, Italy
- Key people: Gianluca Seguso (CEO, Seguso); Pierpaolo Seguso (Creative Director, Seguso); Gianandrea Seguso (Sales and Business Development, Seguso); Giampaolo Seguso (Patriarch, Artist and Poet)
- Products: Lighting; Furniture; Objects; Glassware; Custom
- Brands: Seguso Vetri d'Arte; Seguso Interiors; Seguso Viro
- Website: www.seguso.com

Seguso is a Murano glass manufacturer that has operated in Venice since May 3, 1397. It is considered one of the most prestigious glass manufacturers in Venice. They also own one of the largest glass furnaces in Murano, which has a few, homonymous furnaces. Their works can be found in over 75 museums worldwide, such as MoMA in New York and the Victoria and Albert Museum in London. Today, Seguso is known for its high-end Venetian glass objects, lighting, accessories and custom installations. Seguso glass has been made for the Pope, royalty and numerous luxury interiors throughout the world.

== Family tradition ==
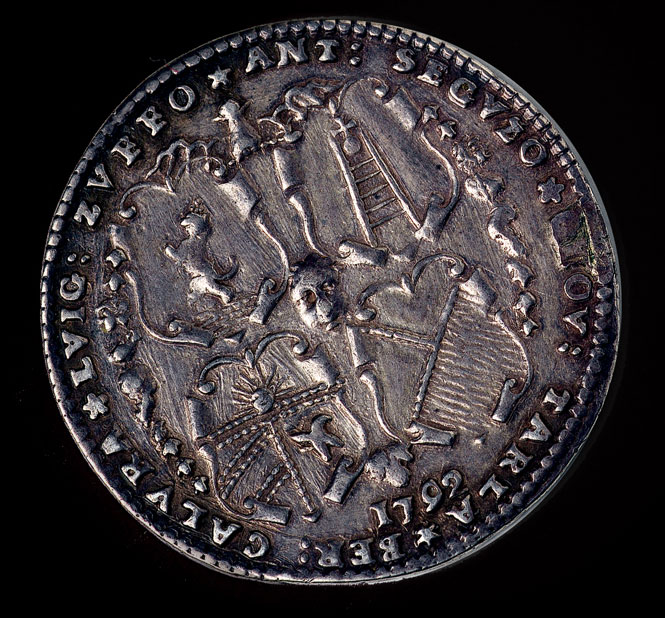
A silver "Osella" coin featuring the coat of arms of the Seguso Family, Murano 1792.

The Seguso family today is able to trace its uninterrupted lineage of glassmakers back over six centuries to 1397, based on documents in the archives of Venice. In 1605, the family was added to the Libro d’Oro (Golden Book) of Murano, which included the most important glassmaking families and offered them privileges of nobility. The Seguso glassmakers were especially successful between the mid 16th and 17th centuries when they created an extensive commercial network for their products that reached as far as the newly discovered Americas. During this successful period the Seguso family crest was imprinted on the osella coin of Venice by the Doge in 1792.

However, it was not until the 19th century that they produced their best work and became one of the leading glassmakers on the island of Murano, as well as internationally. Antonio Seguso (b.1829) singularly revived forgotten, sophisticated techniques to play a crucial role in the glass renaissance of the mid-19th century, when Murano glassmaking was recovering from its most difficult period of crisis after the fall of the Venetian Republic.

His son, Giovanni (b. 1853) was an eccentric and equally talented glassmaker, who for a time worked with Paolo Venini. Venini often used to tell visitors, “Nane Patare (nickname of Giovanni Seguso) taught me everything about glass.”

Antonio Seguso (b. 1888), the son of Giovanni, was also a talented glassmaker and along with Napoleone Barovier and Luigi Ferro, founded Artistica Vetreria e Soffieria Barovier, Seguso and Ferro in 1933, this company would eventually become Seguso Vetri d’Arte, employing all five sons of Antonio Seguso in various roles, including Archimede Seguso for a period of time, the father of Giampaolo Seguso, and grandfather to the current generation guiding the Seguso company today, Gianluca, Pierpaolo and Gianandrea Seguso. The brand, trademark, designs and archives of Seguso Vetri d’Arte are today in the hands of the family and sold throughout the world.

== Family Lineage ==
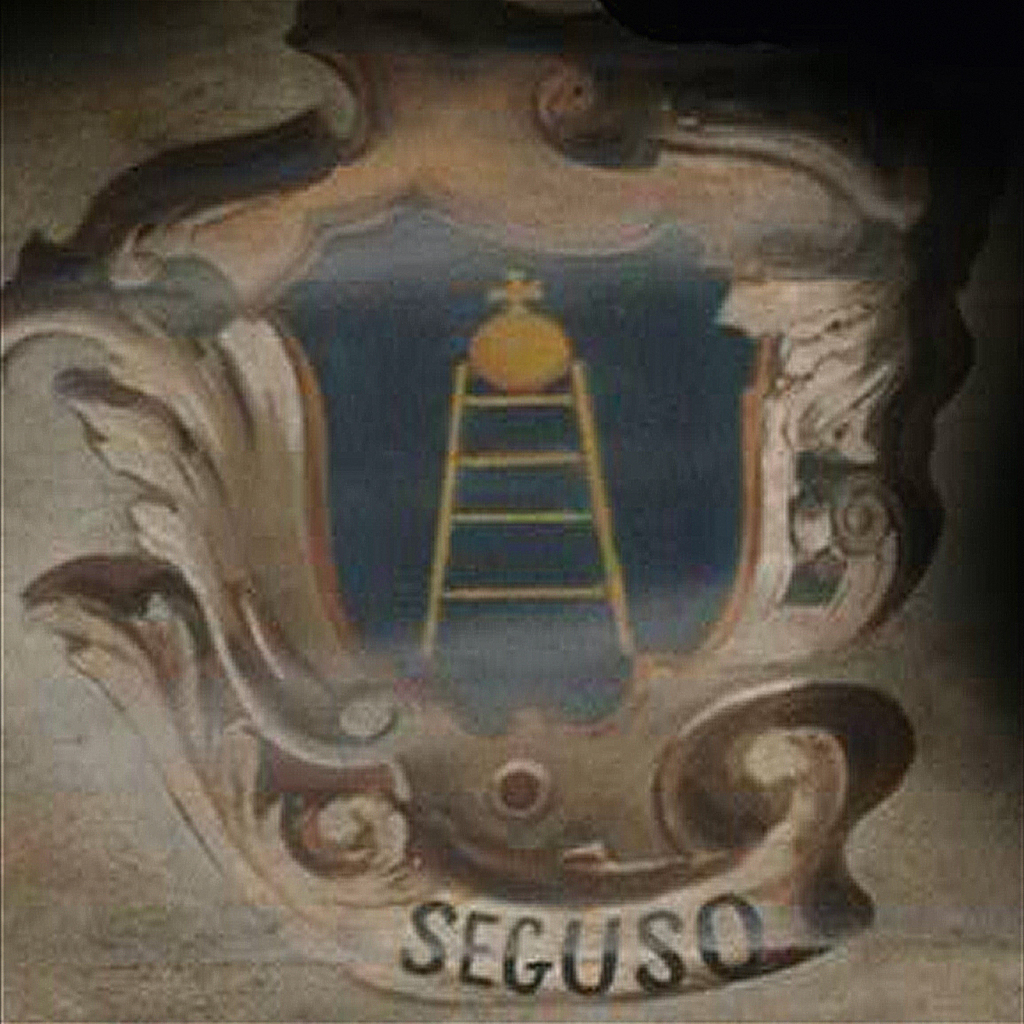
The coat of arms of the Seguso family, painted on the ceiling of the Murano Glass Museum.

14th Century	Antonio Filius Seguxi (1397)
15th Century	Francesco (di Antonio) (1465) Vincenzo
16th Century	Giovanni - Zuanne (1533/1613) Vincenzo (1564); Giacomo (1602)
17th Century	Benedetto (1626) Andrea (1665); Benedetto (1694)
18th Century	Giovanni - Zuanne (1722) Benedetto Rosega (1746); Giovanni (1770/1858)
19th Century	Luigi (1804) Antonio (1829); Giovanni - Nane Patare (1853/1931); Antonio - Toni Patare (1888/1965) Founder of Seguso Vetri d’Arte
20th Century (Sons of Antonio-b.1888)	Ernesto (1904/1986) Archimede - Moro Patare (1909–1999); Bruno (1915–2001); Isidoro (1918/1981); Angelo (1921/2005)
Current	Giampaolo Seguso (1942) Gianluca (1971) – CEO of Seguso; Pierpaolo (1974) – Creative Director of Seguso; GianAndrea (1976) – Sales and Business Development; MariaGiulia (1981)

== The Brands and Collections of Seguso ==
=== Seguso Vetri d’Arte ===
Seguso Vetri d’Arte founded in 1933, quickly became one of the most important glass furnaces in Murano and the center of creative energy and technical innovation on the island during the mid twentieth century. After the Seguso Vetri d’Arte brand was sold by the Seguso family in 1974, current Seguso CEO, Gianluca Seguso was able to bring the brand, along with its rich trove of archives back into the hands of the Seguso family in 2007. Today Seguso still manufacturers and sells the iconic and timeless designs of Seguso Vetri d’Arte, under its historical name.

=== Seguso Interiors ===
Seguso Interiors is an innovative collection of lighting, furniture, and architectural elements created by Pierpaolo Seguso. The division is dedicated to the decoration and lighting of interiors projects, in a continuous challenge to go beyond the boundaries of production capabilities. Architects and Interior Designers find in Seguso Interiors a reality in which each project is conceived as a tailored suit. Its unique furniture design is the result of a patent received by Seguso Creative Director, Pierpaolo Seguso.

=== Seguso Viro ===
Seguso Viro is known for its line of contemporary glassware. Started in 1993 with the idea of Giampaolo Seguso for putting the individual at the center (from the Latin vir or mankind) and doing so with the intention of a production based on profound technical research rooted in tradition. Today, glass from the Seguso Viro collections, 101 Limited and Collezioni, is sold by Seguso.

== Seguso Experience ==
In 2012 Seguso became one of the first furnaces to open their doors to visitors through a program called the Seguso Experience. With the intent to emotionally move the audience, visitors experience the flavors, colors and atmosphere passed down from each Seguso generation. Gianluca and Pierpaolo Seguso's spoke of the inspiration for this type of visit: his desire to deliver a unique experience to visitors that demonstrates the character of Murano. He imagined it as an alternative way to experience Murano glass art distinct from the commercial and touristic influences that exist throughout the island. The Seguso Experience has been listed on Trip Advisor as a recommended activity on the island of Murano.
