= Salviati (glassmakers) =

Historical family of glassmakers in Italy

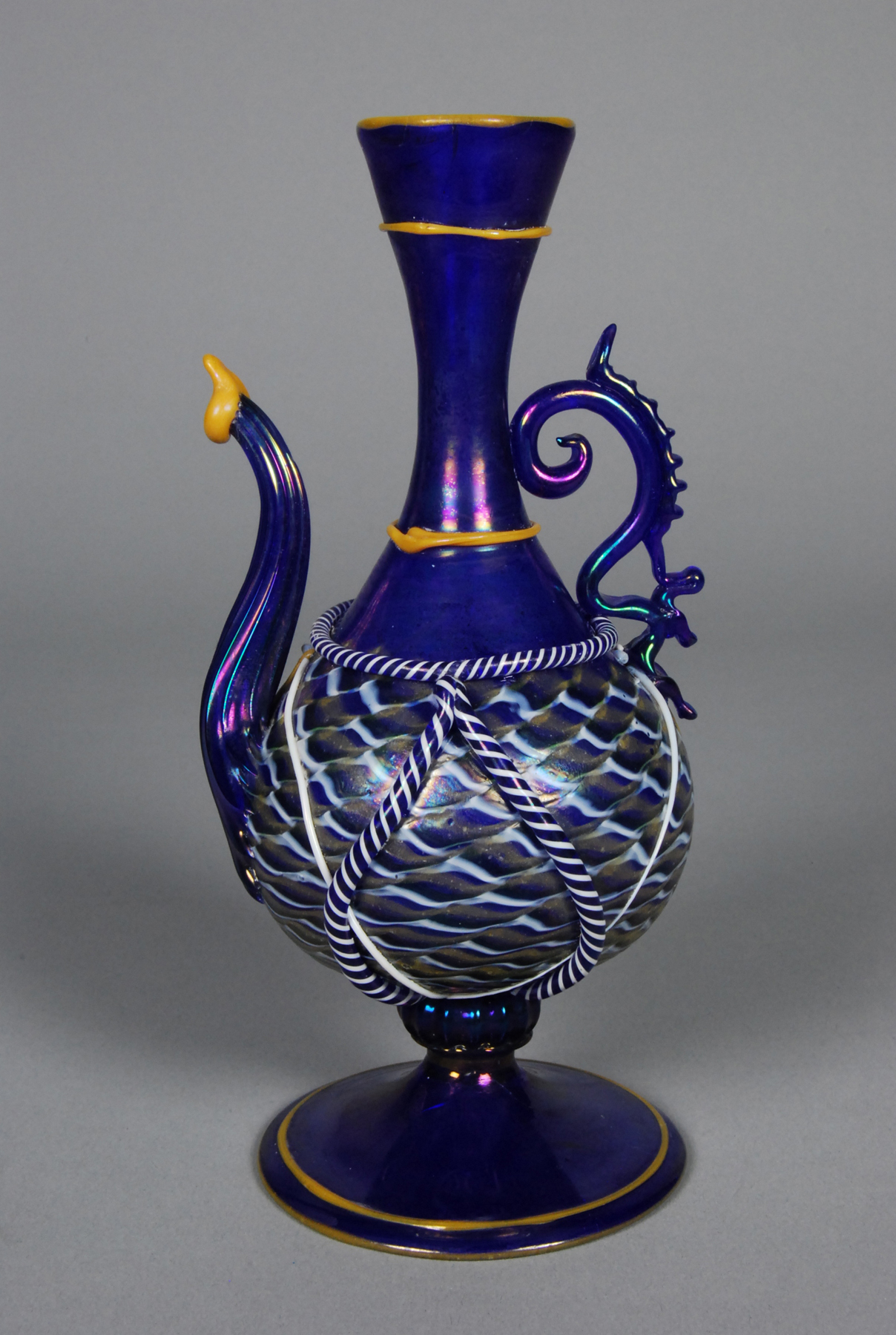
Ewer made by Salviati & Co, now in Walters Art Museum.

A family called Salviati were glass makers and mosaicists in Murano, Venice and also in London, working as the firm Salviati, Jesurum & Co. of 213 Regent Street, London; also as Salviati and Co. and later (after 1866) as the Venice and Murano Glass and Mosaic Company (Today Pauly & C. - Compagnia Venezia Murano).

== History ==
In World War II, the Palazzo Salviati on the Grand Canal of Venice was occupied by the Nazis and used as a Nazi Headquarters. The Camerino family fled the Holocaust to various locations throughout the world including the UK, USA, Israel, and South Africa. In 1898, the company's new London premises at 235 Regent Street (now the Apple Store) incorporated a set of mosaic armorials along the façade, which are still visible today and were restored in 1999.

The company was founded by Antonio Salviati, a lawyer from Vicenza in Northern Italy.

The company was later acquired in 1999 by the French glassmaker that would later be known as Arc International.

== Mosaics ==
Many famous mosaics were made by Salviati, and the company's various historical name changes are well documented

=== London ===
- the Central Lobby of the Palace of Westminster
- the Albert Memorial
- Westminster Abbey's Altar Screen
- Westminster Cathedral
- St Paul's Cathedral

=== Birmingham ===
- the Council House, Birmingham
- the Chamberlain Memorial, Birmingham.

=== Other ===
- St David's Cathedral in Wales.
- the Paris Opera House
- Ajuda National Palace, Lisbon.
