= Murano Glass Museum =

Museum on the history of glass in Murano, Italy

Coordinates: 45°27′23″N 12°21′24″E

Museo del Vetro (Glass Museum)
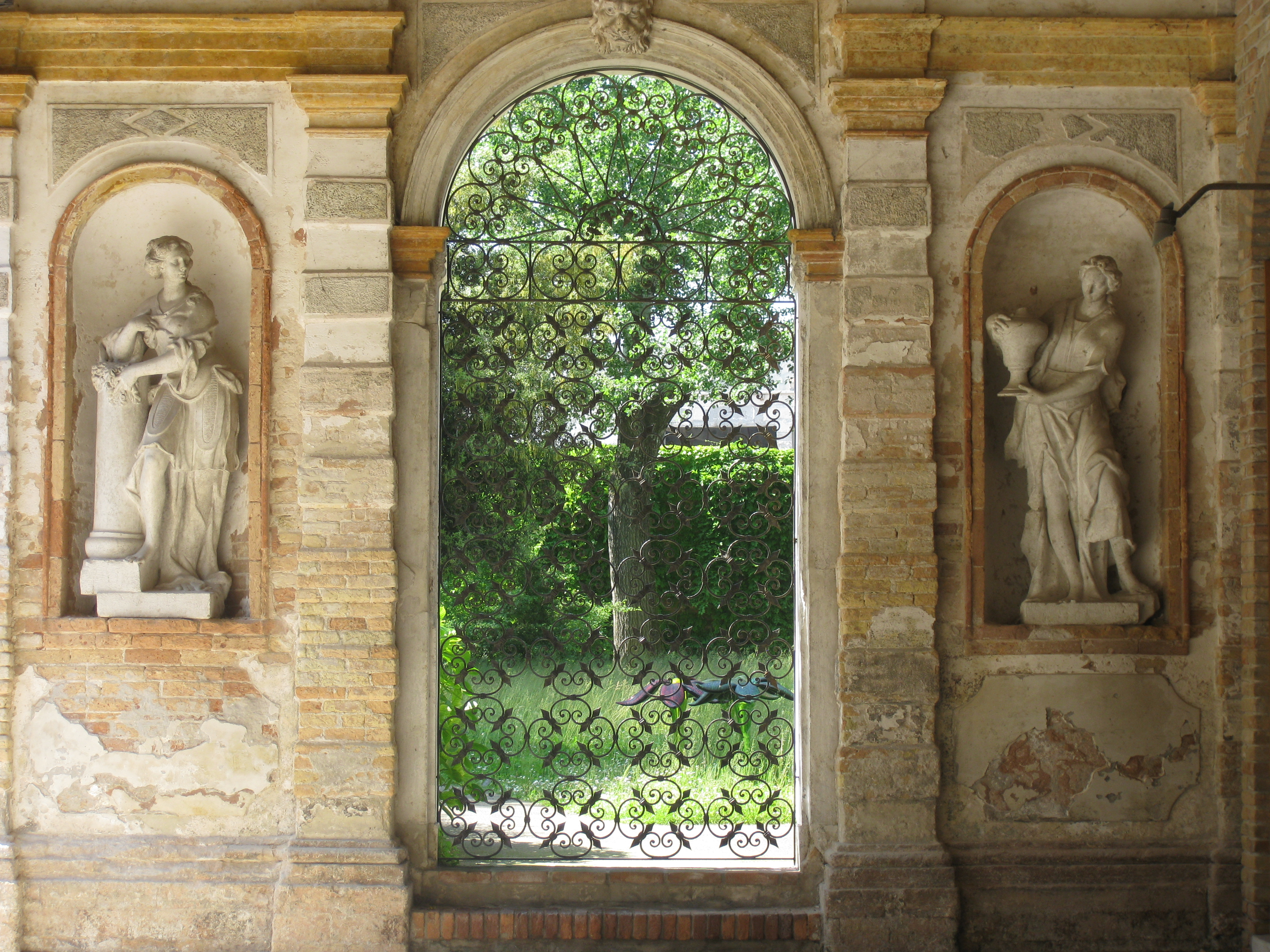
- Established: 1923
- Location: Fondamenta Giustinian 8, 30121 Murano, Italy
- Type: Art museum, Historic site
- Director: Chiara Squarcina
- Website: museovetro.visitmuve.it

The Murano Glass Museum (Italian: Museo del Vetro) is a museum on the history of glass, including local Murano glass, located on the island of Murano, just north of Venice, Italy.

== History ==
The museum was founded in 1861. It was originally built in the Gothic style as a patrician's palace. The building became the residence of Bishop Marco Giustinian in 1659. He later bought it and donated it to the Torcello diocese. In 1805, the Torcello diocese was closed. In 1840, the palace was sold to the Murano Municipality, who would use it as a town hall, museum, and archives. In 1923, when the Murano Municipality joined Venice, the museum came under the management of the Fondazione Musei Civici di Venezia (MUVE), its current operator.

== Location ==
It is located close to the "Museo" vaporetto water bus stop.

== Collection ==
The collection of the museum, one of the most complete in the world, ranges from antiquity to 20th century works including realizations by the famous Barovier & Toso glass company and glass textiles designed by Carlo Scarpa in the late thirties.

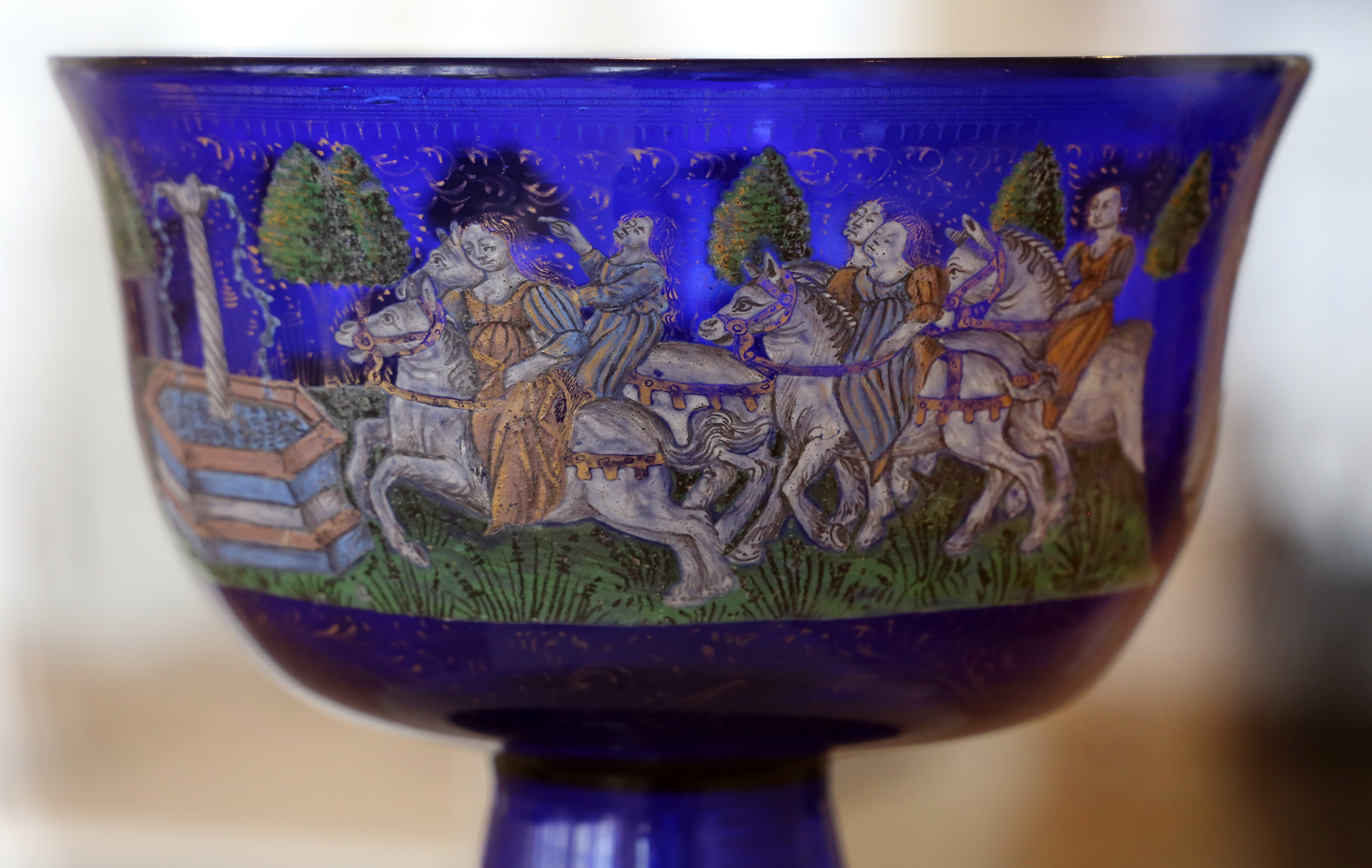
Barovier Cup.

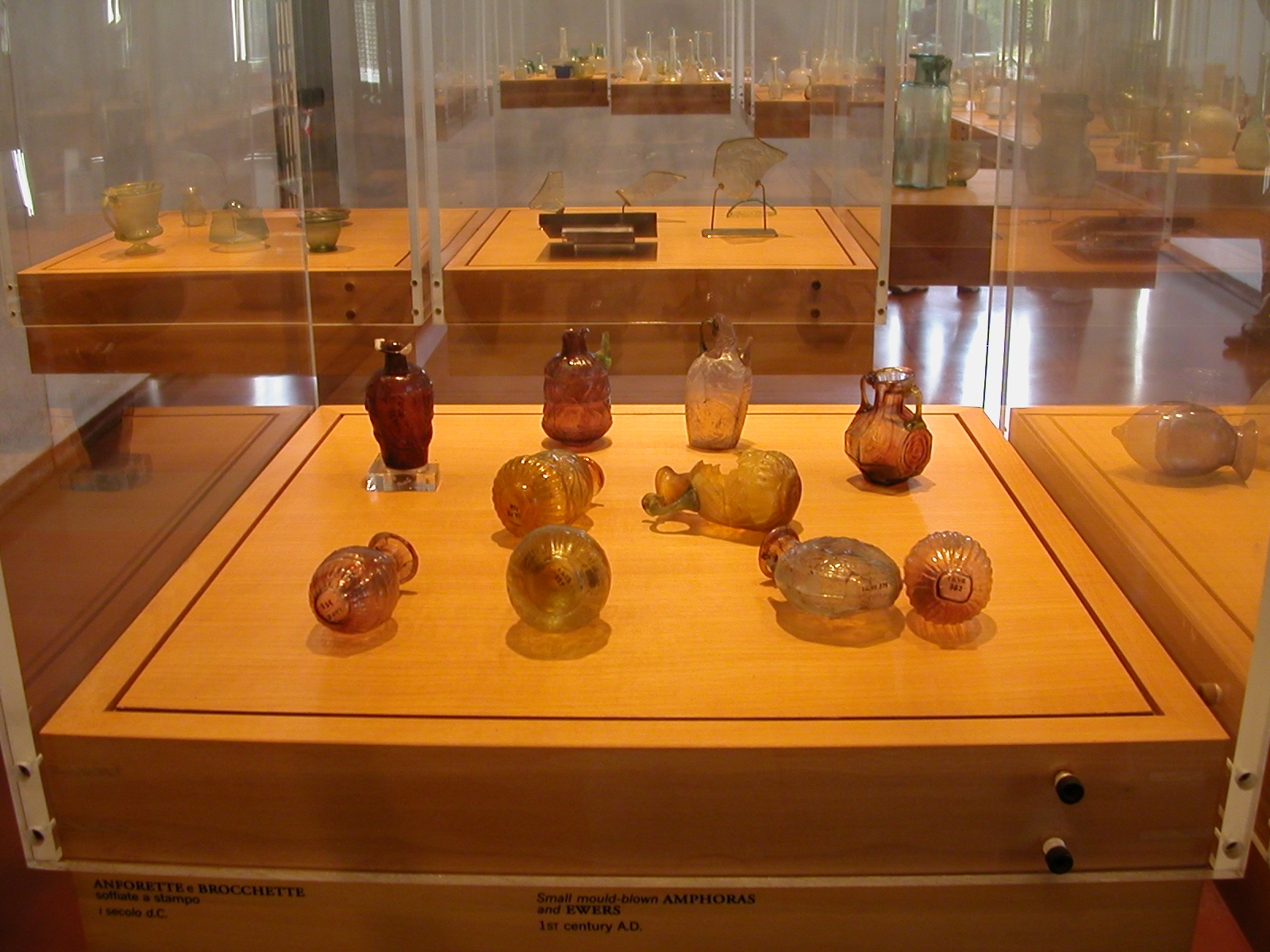
Roman glass exhibit at the Museum.

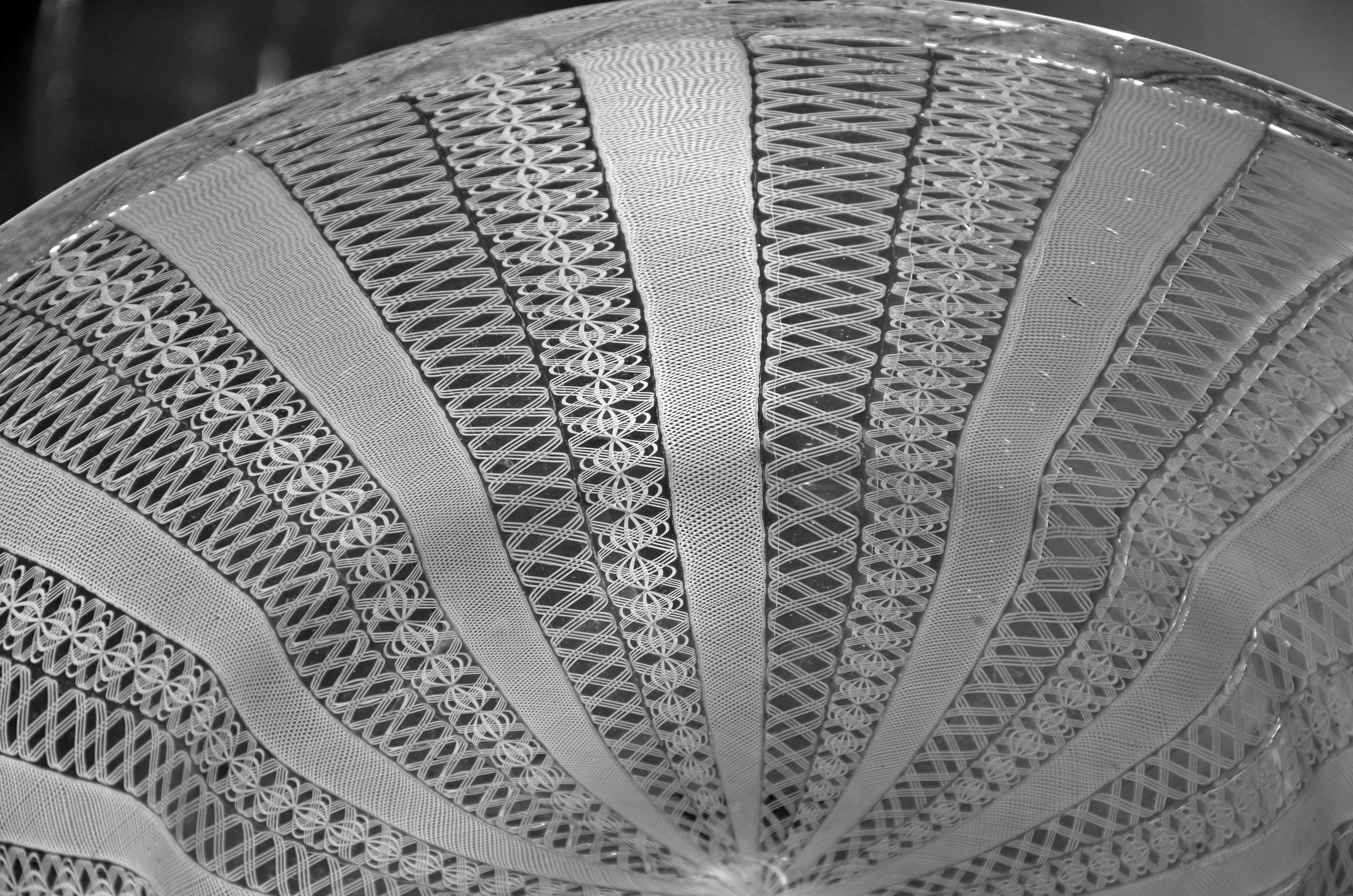
Filigree glass, end of the 16th century or beginning of the 17th century.

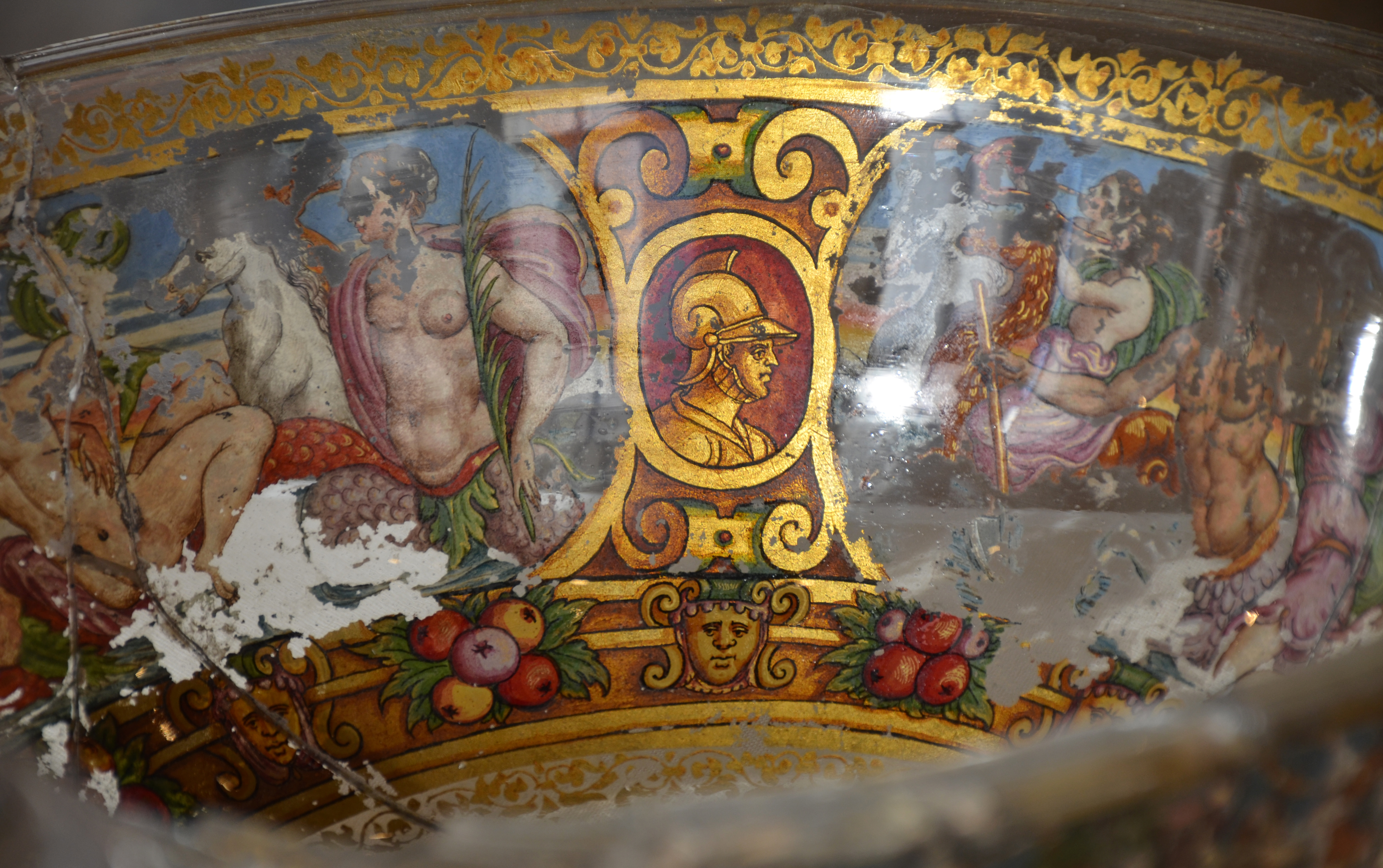
Crystal blown decorated with enamels and gold cold painted on the back. Venice, second half of the 16th century.

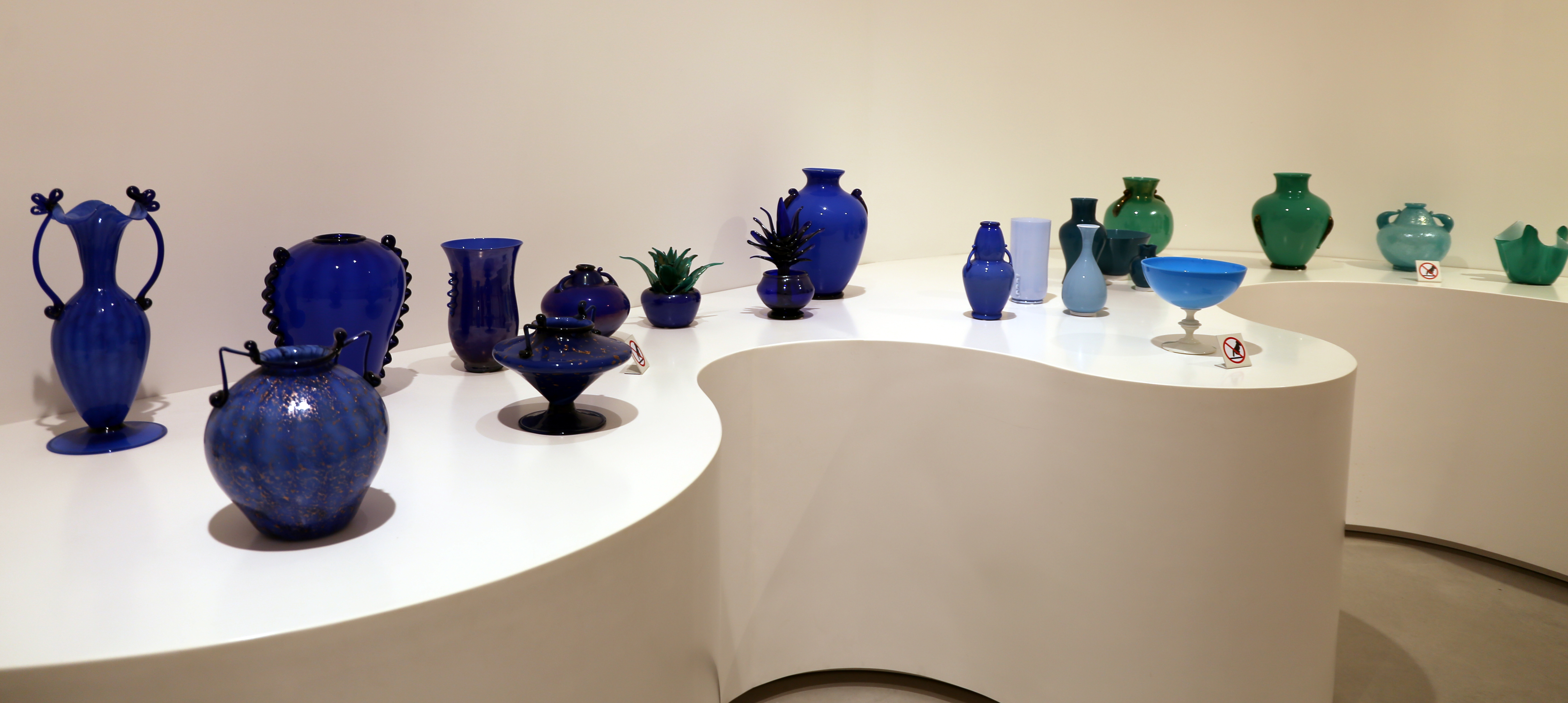
Exhibit.

== See also ==
- History of glass
- Murano glass
- MUVE
- Paolo Venini
