= Stazione Sperimentale del Vetro =

Italian research institute

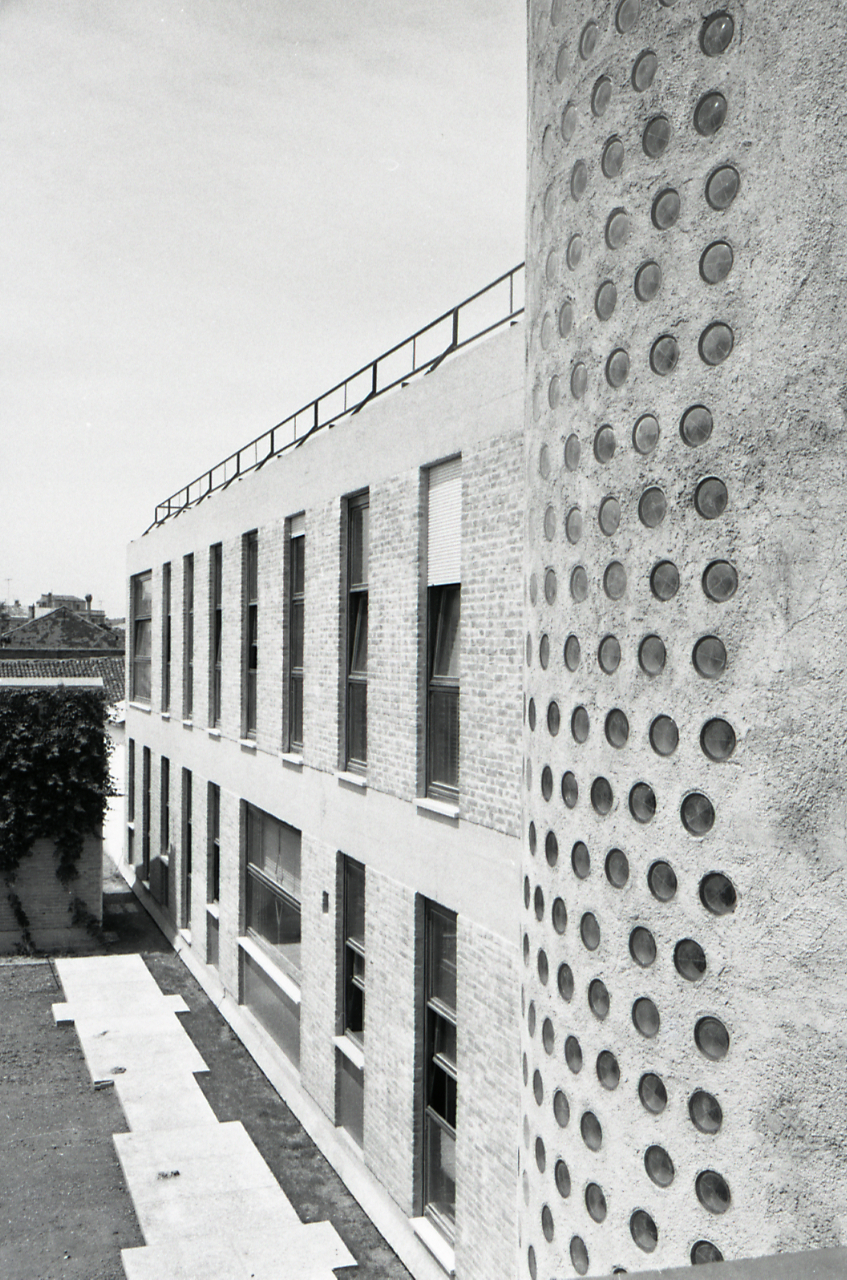
Building of the Stazione Sperimentale del Vetro photographed by Paolo Monti in 1962

The Stazione Sperimentale del Vetro (SSV) (Experimental Station for Glass) is a special Agency of the Chamber of Commerce in Venice. It is an Institute for applied research, established in 1956 in a site in Venice - Murano, provided by the Venetian Municipality, and operating on a national scale with the specific aim of promoting the technical and technological progress in the glass and derived products industry. In 1999 SSV was transformed into a public economic institution with important legal, operational and administrative modifications which, however, have left its mission and functions unchanged.

On May 2, 2013 the joint stock consortium company called "Experimental Glass Station" was created, with 75% shareholding expressed by the Chamber of Commerce, Industry, Crafts and Agriculture of Venice, and 25% by the Glass Industrialists through the Assovetro Servizi S.r.l.

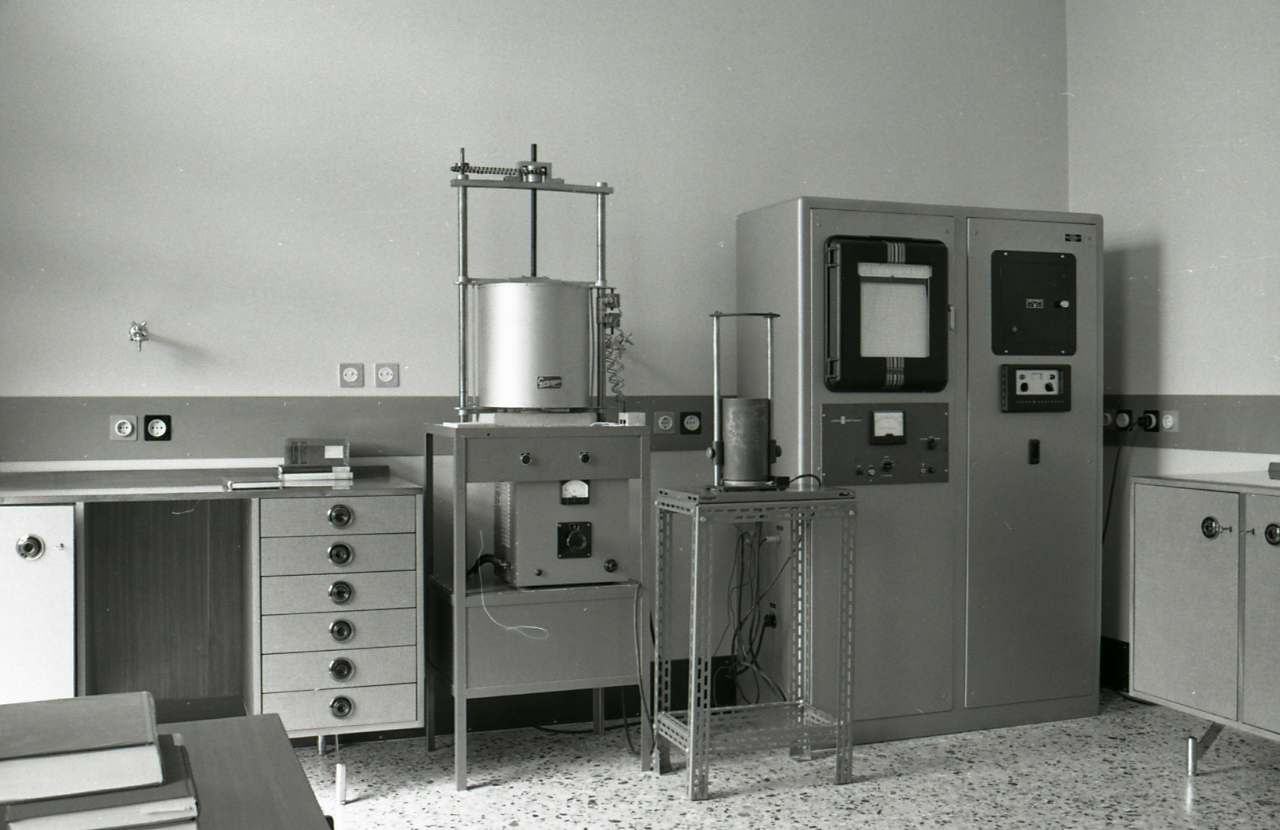
A laboratory in the Stazione Sperimentale del Vetro photographed by Paolo Monti in 1962

== See also ==
- Stazione Sperimentale per i Combustibili
- Stazione Sperimentale per le Industrie degli Oli e dei Grassi
- Stazione Sperimentale per la Seta
