= Nissan Murano =

Mid-size crossover SUV

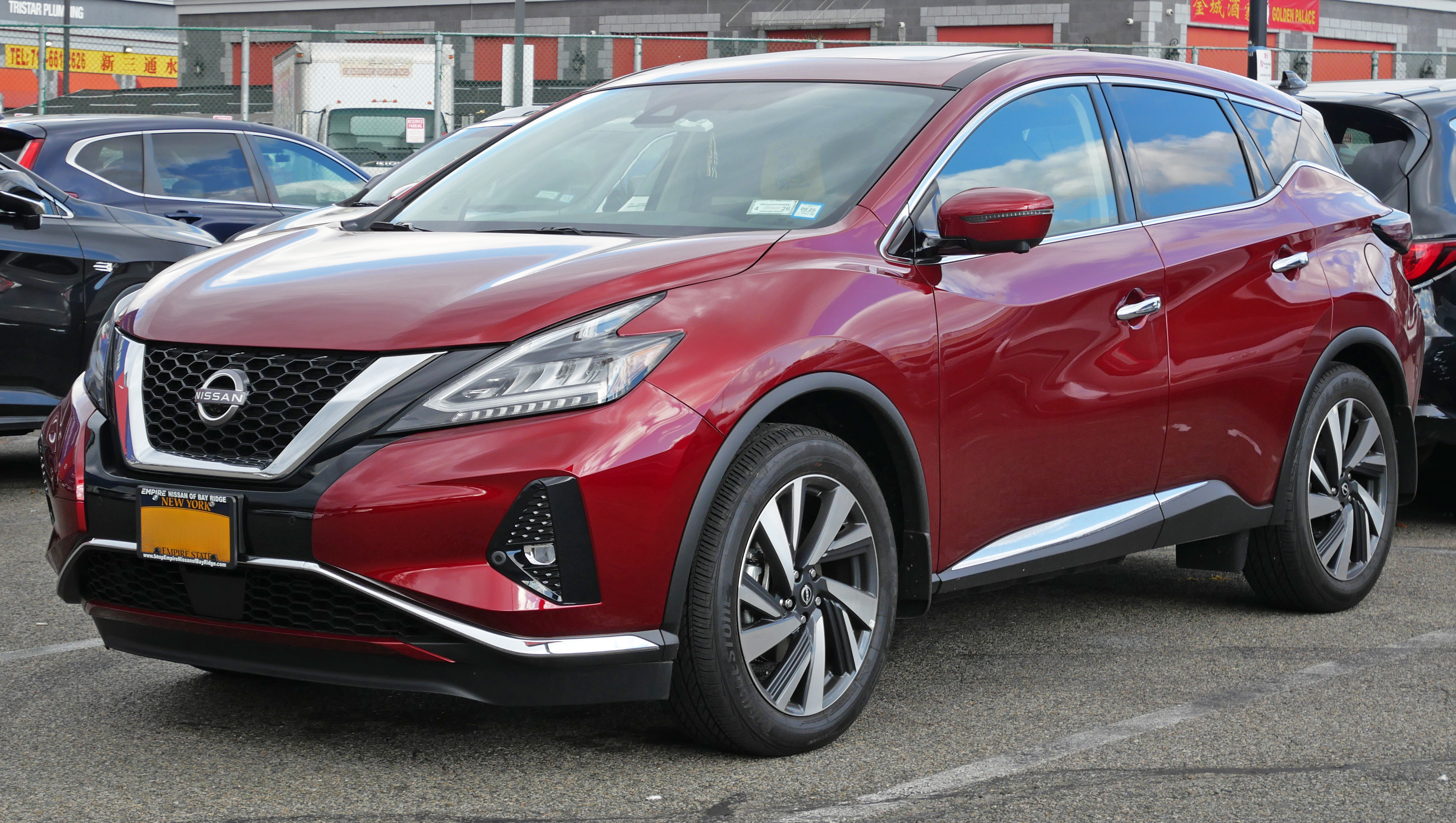
- 2024 Nissan Murano (Z52)

Overview
- Manufacturer: Nissan
- Production: 2002–present
- Model years: 2003–present

Body and chassis
- Class: Mid-size crossover SUV
- Layout: Front-engine, front-wheel-drive or all-wheel-drive

Chronology
- Predecessor: Nissan R'nessa (Japan)
- Successor: Nissan Pathfinder (China)

The Nissan Murano (Japanese: 日産・ムラーノ, Hepburn: Nissan Murāno) is a mid-size crossover SUV manufactured and marketed by Nissan since May 2002 for the 2003 model year. The fourth generation was revealed in October 2024.

As Nissan's first crossover SUV for the United States and Canada, the Murano was designed at Nissan America in La Jolla, California, and was based on the Nissan FF-L platform shared with the third generation Altima. The European version of the Murano began sales in 2004.

The Murano was Nissan's only crossover SUV in the United States until September 2007, when the Rogue went on sale. In Canada, the X-Trail had been on sale as Nissan's second car based SUV since 2004 as a model for 2005; it was replaced by the 2008 Rogue at the end of 2007. The Murano is sized between the Pathfinder and the discontinued Xterra (which was replaced by the Rogue as a compact SUV). For the model years of 2011 to 2014, a convertible variant, the Murano CrossCabriolet, was available for the second-generation model. As of 2018, the Murano is sized between the X-Trail and the larger Pathfinder.

The nameplate Murano derives from the Italian islands of Murano and the namesake Murano art glass for which the islands are widely known.

== First generation (Z50; 2002) ==
First generation
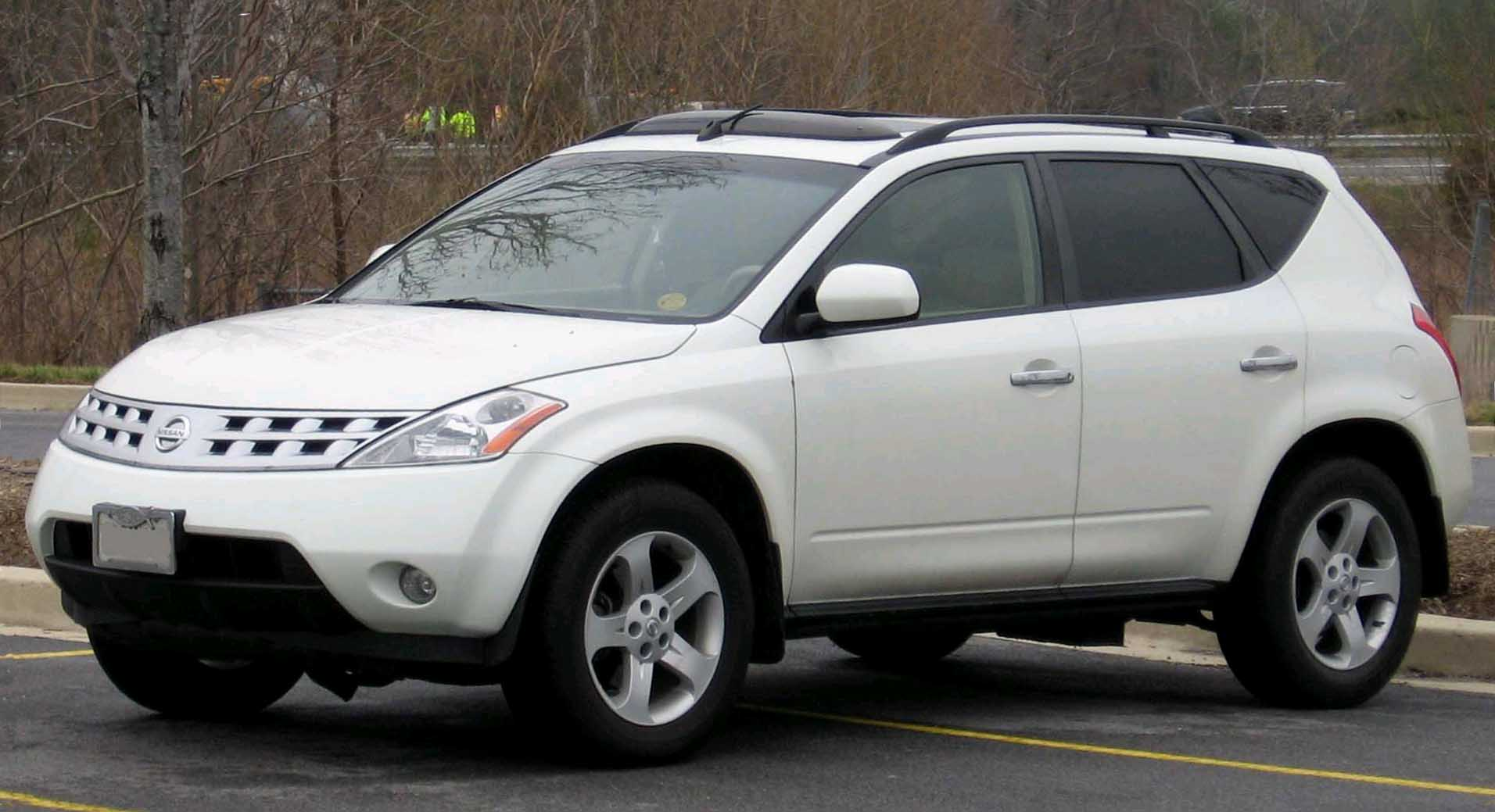
- 2003–2005 Nissan Murano (US)

Overview
- Model code: Z50
- Production: May 2002 – October 2007
- Model years: 2003–2007
- Assembly: Japan: Kanda, Fukuoka (Nissan Shatai)
- Designer: Ajay Panchal, Taiji Toyota (chief designer)

Body and chassis
- Body style: 5-door SUV
- Platform: Nissan FF-L platform
- Related: Nissan Altima (L31); Nissan Maxima (A34); Nissan Quest (V42); Nissan Teana (J31)

Powertrain
- Engine: Gasoline: 2.5 L QR25DE I4; 3.5 L VQ35DE V6
- Transmission: CVT; 4-speed automatic

Dimensions
- Wheelbase: 2,825 mm (111.2 in)
- Length: 4,770 mm (187.8 in)
- Width: 1,880 mm (74.0 in)
- Height: 1,705–1,709 mm (67.1–67.3 in)
- Curb weight: 1,747–1,807 kg (3,851–3,983 lb)

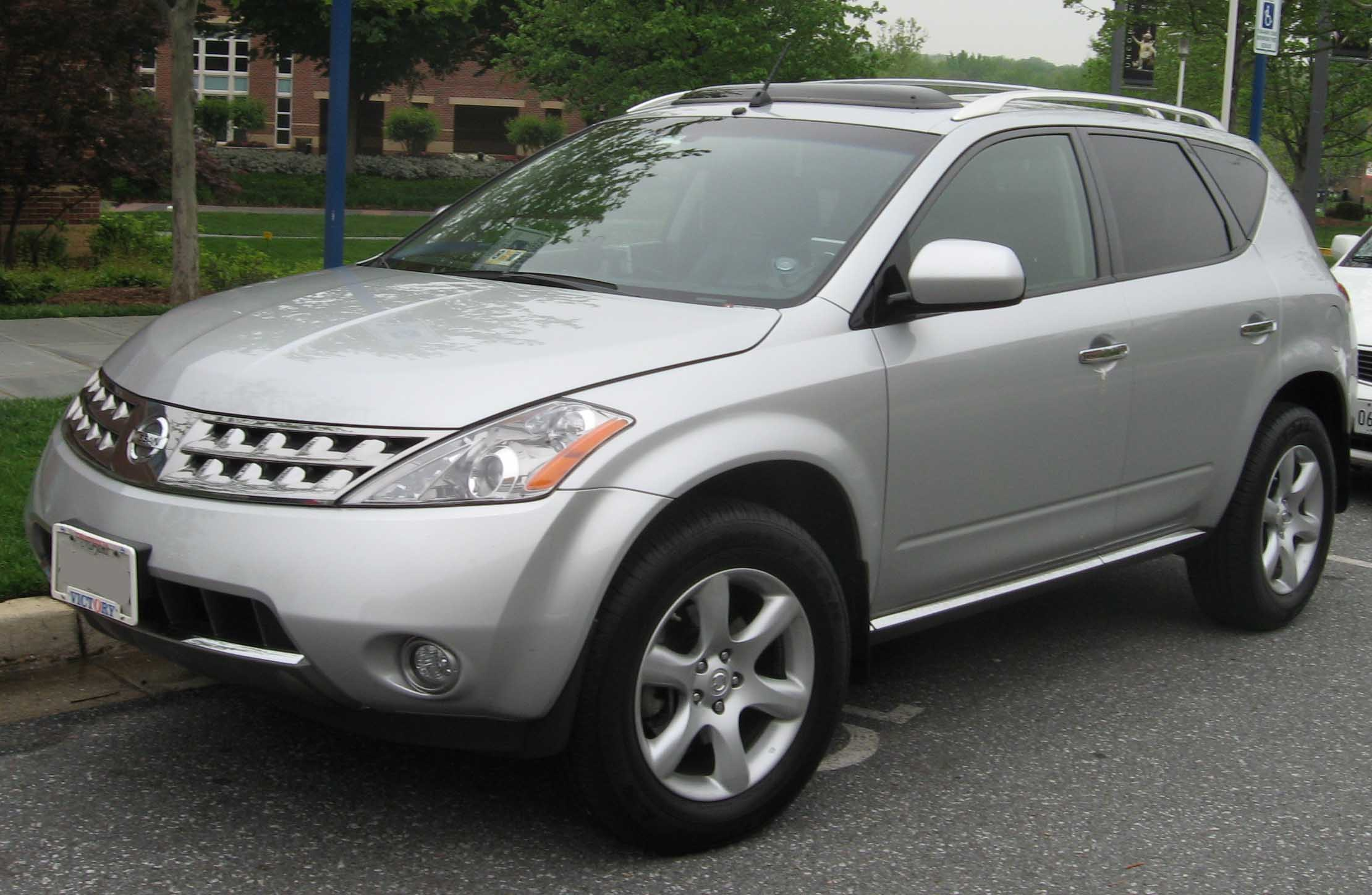
2006–2008 Nissan Murano SE (US)

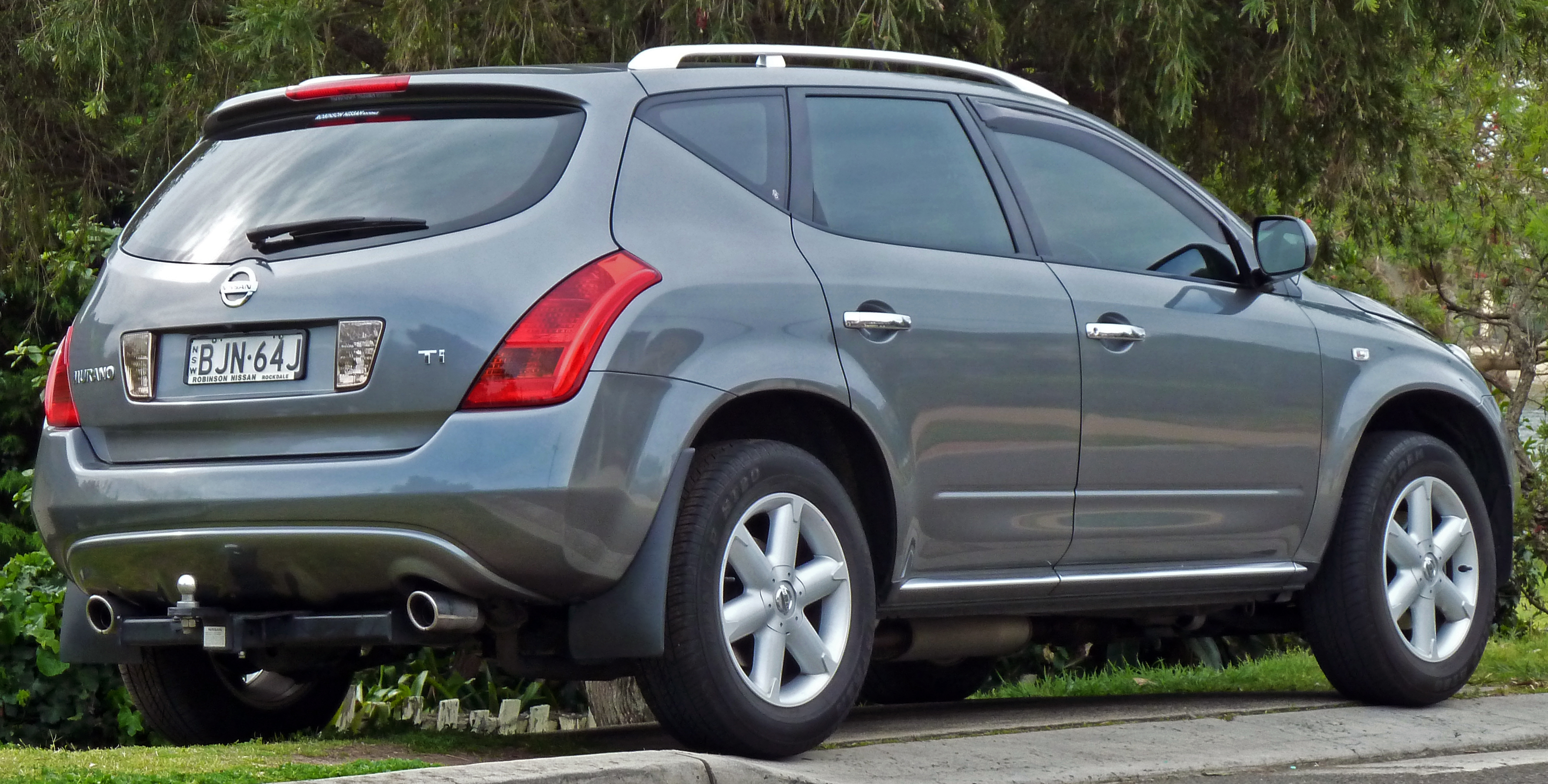
2005–2008 Nissan Murano Ti (Australia)

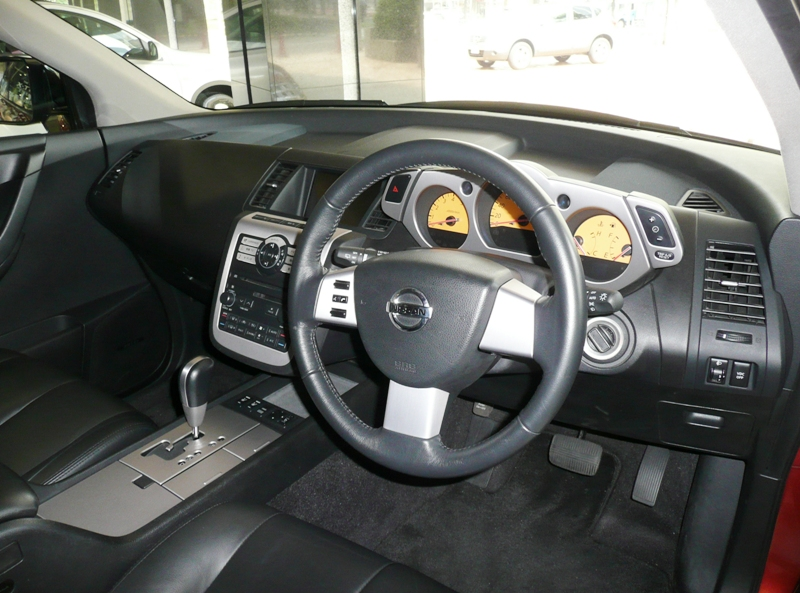
Interior

The first generation Nissan Murano was unveiled in production form for the 2003 model year, at the 2002 New York International Auto Show. It is powered by a 3.5-liter (VQ35DE) V6 producing 183 kW (245 hp) and 334 N⋅m (246 lbf⋅ft), also used in several other Nissan models like the Altima, Maxima, and Nissan 350Z, but specifically tuned for use in the Murano. Available with standard front-wheel-drive (FWD) and optional all-wheel-drive (AWD), the Nissan Murano is one of the largest vehicles using a continuously variable transmission (CVT). Fuel economy was rated at 13 L/100 km; 22 mpg_{‑imp} (18 mpg_{‑US}) in the city and 10 L/100 km; 28 mpg_{‑imp} (23 mpg_{‑US}) on the highway (same mpg FWD and AWD on the new EPA specifications).

Production started in the middle of May 2002, and the first vehicles shipped in early June for the United States and mid-July for Canadian markets. Sales in Europe started in 2004, following its European premiere at the 2004 Geneva Motor Show. An independent suspension on all wheels was used for class-leading ride and handling.

For the 2006 model year in North America, the Murano received some updates in the form of LED tail lamps and turn signals, standard color information screen, available backup camera (standard in Canada for all models), GPS and a restyled front end with some minor trim updates. In September 2004, the Murano was introduced in Japan, replacing the Bassara MPV and exclusive to Nissan Red Stage locations, with a further introduction at Nissan Blue Stage locations in October, replacing the Terrano.

In Japan, the Murano is equipped with many optional features found in North America as standard equipment on Japanese models, including Nissan's GPS and internet-based navigation system called CarWings. Japanese models were available with two engine choices, the 3.5L V6 engine mated to a CVT transmission or a 2.5 L four-cylinder engine with a 4-speed automatic transmission.

=== Murano GT-C ===
Nissan’s Cranfield-based Technical Centre Europe produced a concept of the Murano called the Murano GT-C. The purpose was to gauge consumer interest in a low-volume performance-orientated version of the first generation Murano. The concept featured a raft of performance upgrades over the standard Murano including bigger brakes, revised suspension, exterior styling and a Garret turbocharger that increased power from 172 to 257 kW (234 to 350 PS). This enabled the GT-C to achieve a 0 to 100 km/h (62 mph) of 7 seconds, with a top speed of slightly over 225 km/h (140 mph). Referencing its namesake Murano art glass, the GT-C came with a hand-blown glass gearlever.

=== Safety ===
A full set of airbags, steel-reinforced cabin, and head restraints were safety features designed to protect the interior while VDC, ABS, electronic brakeforce distribution and brake assist were mechanical safety features. VDC incorporates a form of traction control.

The Murano received a crash test rating of five stars in all categories but vehicle rollover (four stars) from the United States National Highway Traffic Safety Administration (NHTSA).

== Second generation (Z51; 2007) ==
Second generation
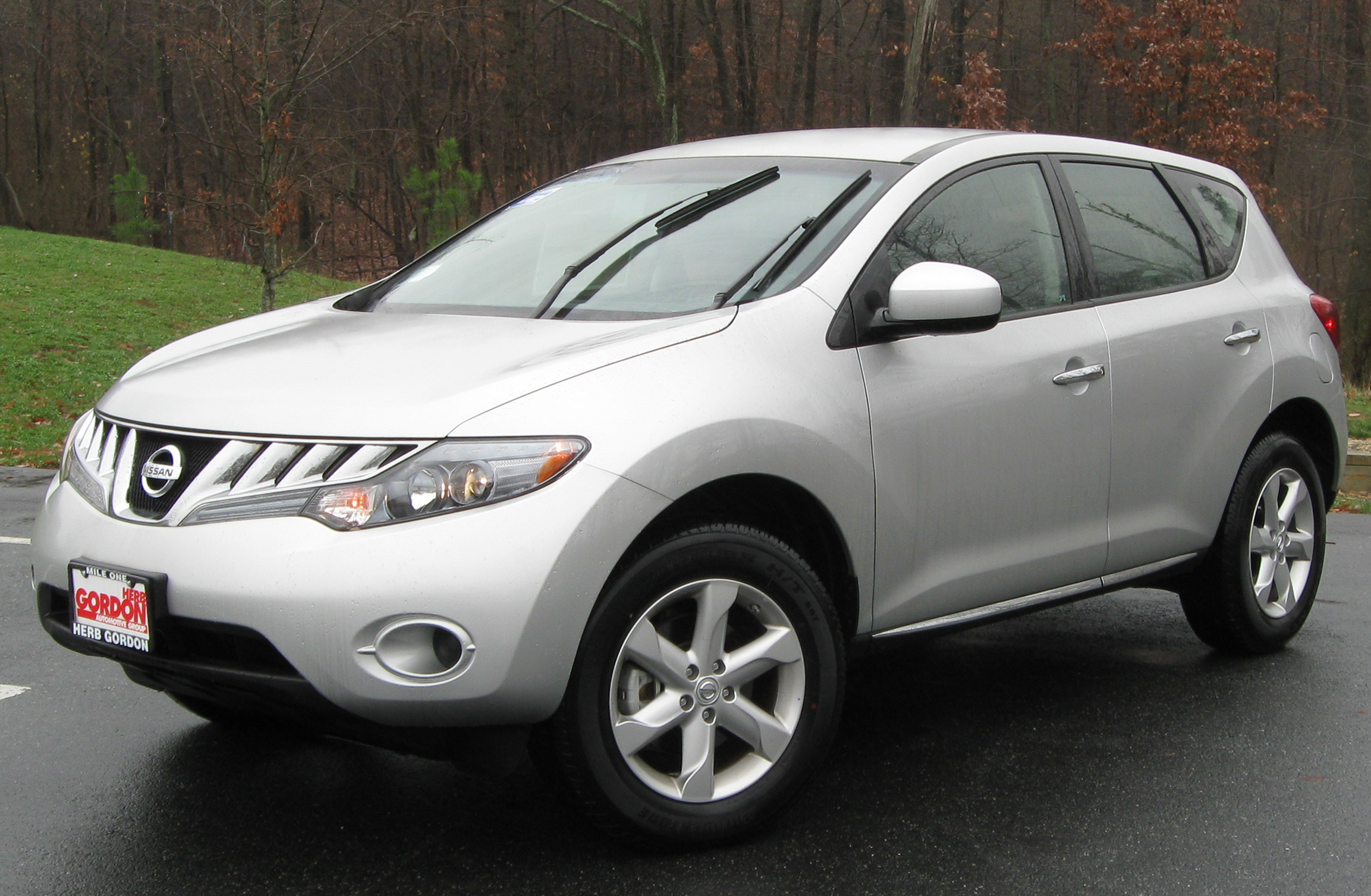
- Pre-facelift

Overview
- Model code: Z51
- Production: November 2007–2014
- Model years: 2009–2014
- Assembly: Japan: Kanda, Fukuoka (Nissan Shatai); Russia: Saint Petersburg (Nissan Manufacturing Rus)
- Designer: Toshiyuki Abe (2005); Jung Kyu Choi

Body and chassis
- Body style: 5-door SUV; 2-door convertible SUV
- Platform: Nissan D platform
- Related: Nissan Altima (L32); Nissan Maxima (A35); Nissan Teana (J32)

Powertrain
- Engine: Gasoline: 2.5 L QR25DE I4; 3.5 L VQ35DE V6; Diesel: 2.5 L YD25DDTi I4
- Transmission: CVT (Gasoline); 6-speed automatic (Diesel)

Dimensions
- Wheelbase: 2,824 mm (111.2 in)
- Length: 4,788–4,823 mm (188.5–189.9 in); 4,829 mm (190.1 in) (CrossCabriolet)
- Width: 1,882 mm (74.1 in); 1,892 mm (74.5 in) (CrossCabriolet)
- Height: 1,699–1,727 mm (66.9–68.0 in); 1,681 mm (66.2 in) (CrossCabriolet)
- Curb weight: 1,759–1,909 kg (3,878–4,209 lb)

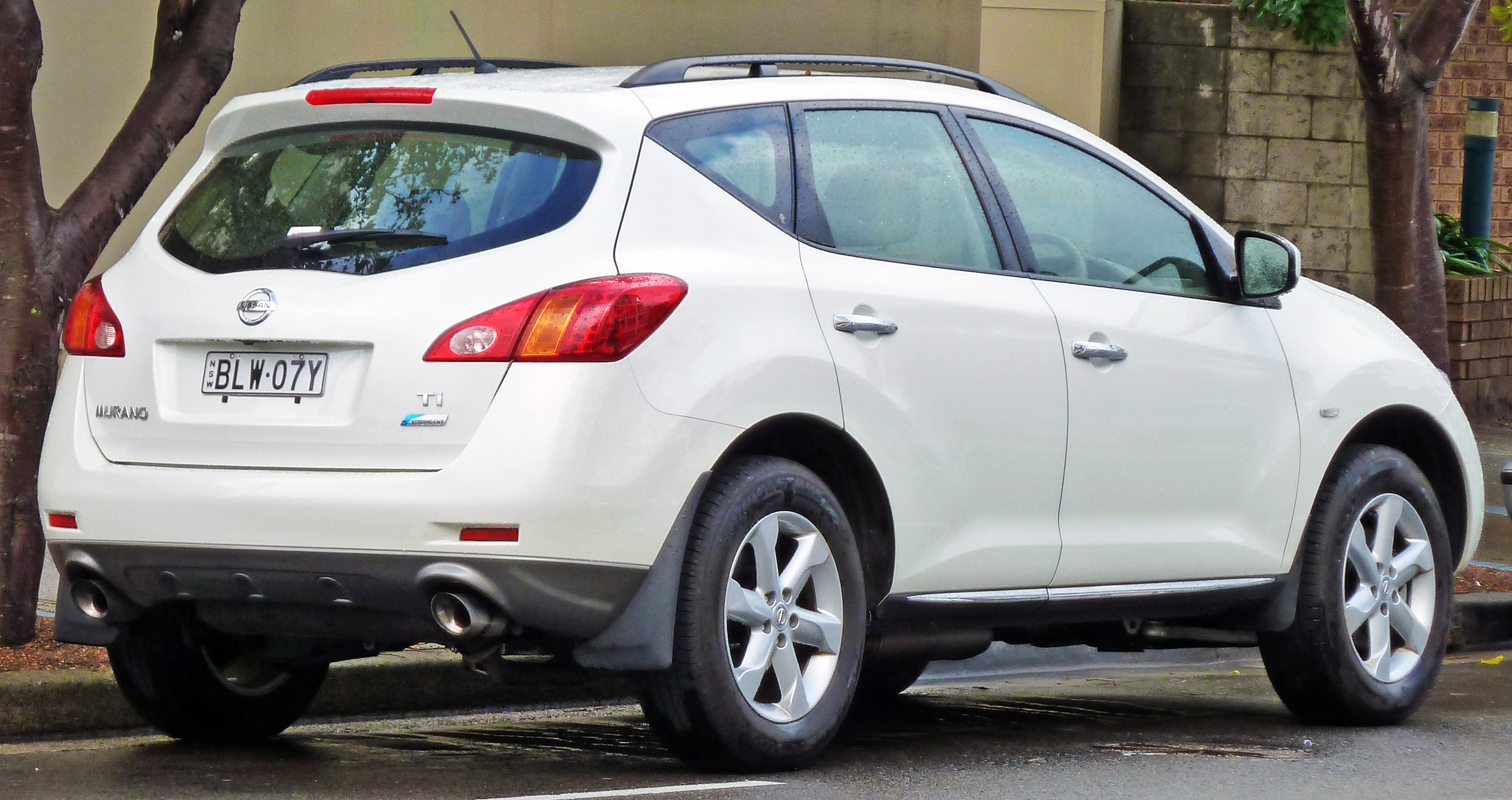
Pre-facelift

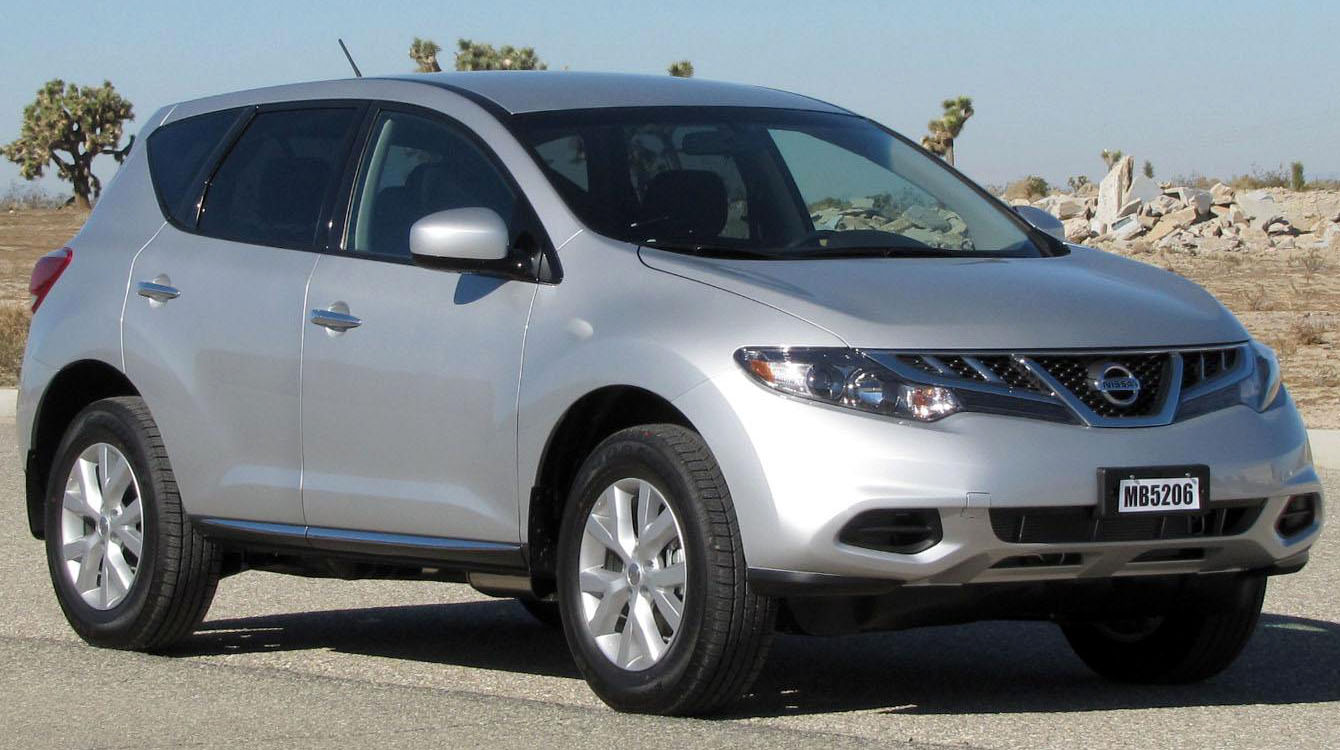

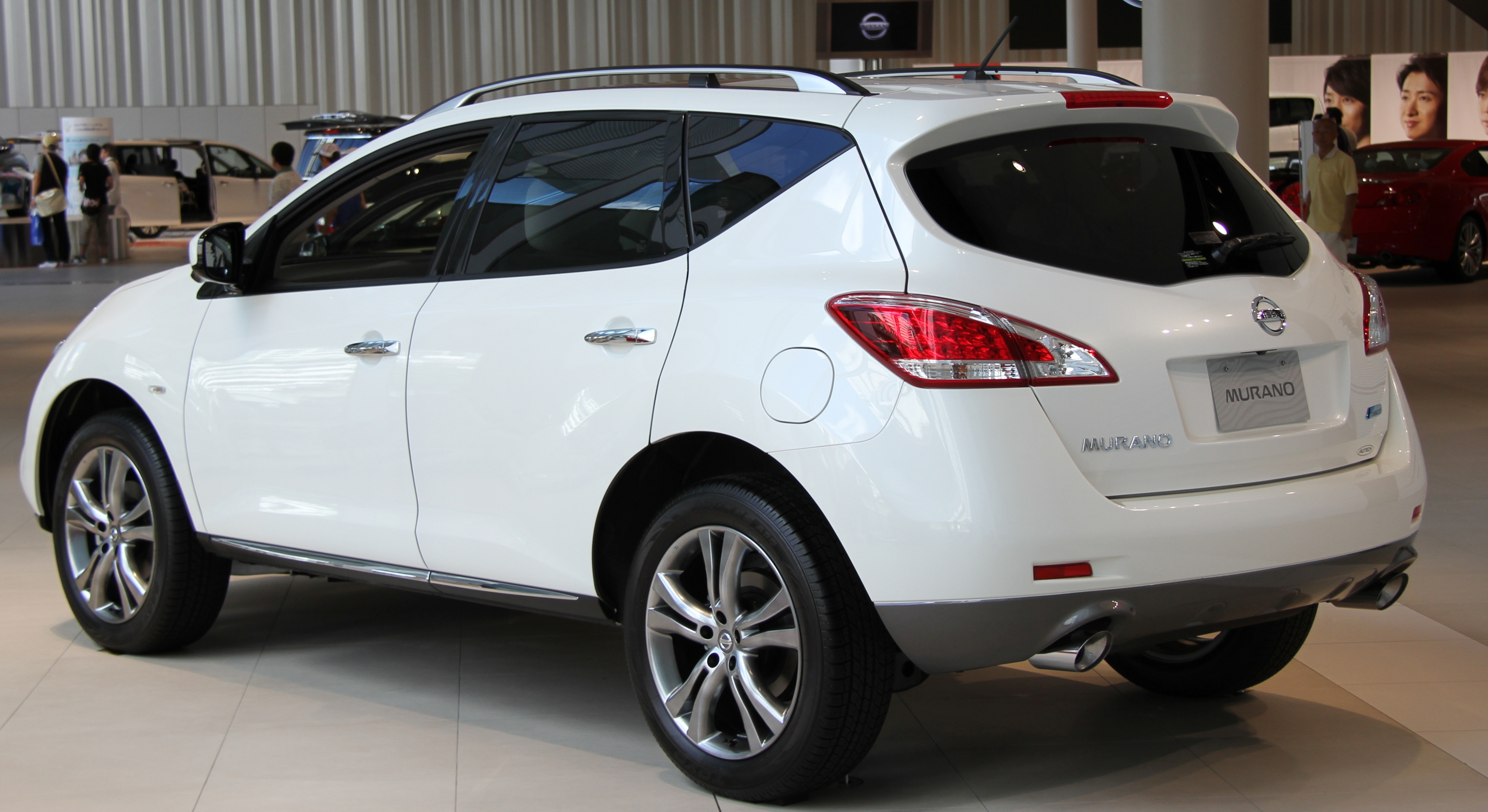
Post-facelift

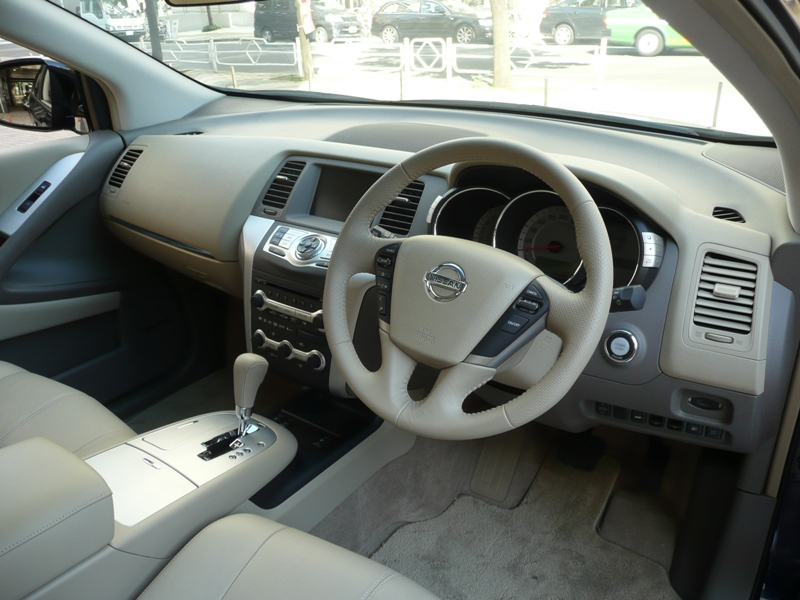
Interior

The second generation Murano made its debut at the 2007 Los Angeles Auto Show in November, and sales began in January 2008 as a 2009 model – the 2008 model year was skipped. The exterior and interior were redesigned.

The second generation Murano was initially offered in three trim levels: the base S, the mid grade SL, and the top level LE (Luxury Edition). The performance oriented SE model was discontinued. The S and SL are offered with standard FWD, with optional iAWD (Intelligent All Wheel Drive) available. The LE trim is iAWD only.

The second generation Murano included new features, some of which were optional or available only on the LE grade, including rain sensing wipers, double stitched leather seats, power rear lift gate, power fold up rear seats, iPod integration, and a hard-drive based, touchscreen navigation system. The S and SL feature aluminum interior accents, while the LE sports wood tone trim. Like the first generation model, there is no third row seat.

The second generation is based on the Nissan D platform, shared with the L32 Altima and the A35 Maxima. The second generation was equipped a revised version of the 3.5 L VQ engine rated at 265 hp (198 kW), an increase of 20 over the previous model. Torque is rated at 336 N⋅m (248 lb⋅ft). The engine is mated to a revised Continuously Variable Transmission with Adaptive Shift Control. The United States EPA fuel economy rating is 13 L/100 km; 22 mpg_{‑imp} (18 mpg_{‑US}) city 10 L/100 km; 28 mpg_{‑imp} (23 mpg_{‑US}) highway.

On September 29, 2008, Nissan released the second generation Murano in Japan, targeted mainly at men in their 30s, 40s and 50s. Nissan announced plans to sell the vehicle in 170 countries. The four-cylinder, 2.5-liter QR engine with 170 PS (125 kW) continued to be offered as an option in Japan.

In July 2010, Nissan launched a facelifted version in Europe only, with an updated 2.5-liter YD25DDTi four cylinder diesel engine. Called the 2.5 dCi, this version offers 190 PS (140 kW) at 4000 rpm and 450 N⋅m (332 lb⋅ft) at 2000 rpm.

For the 2011 model year, the Murano was refreshed to include refreshed front and rear fascias, new headlights and LED taillights, and new 18 inch wheels on the outside. New interior changes included a new white meter color (as opposed to red/orange), new center stack plastic colors matching the leather trim, and added equipment to various trim levels. The refresh also added a new exterior color, "Graphite Blue" and for the 2013 model year the LE trim was renamed to Platinum.

In September 2011, Nissan launched the second-generation Murano in Indonesia. In April 2011, the Murano was officially withdrawn from the United Kingdom, due to disappointing sales.

=== Murano CrossCabriolet (2011) ===
Nissan premiered the Murano CrossCabriolet at the 2010 Los Angeles Auto Show, marketing it as "the world’s first all wheel drive crossover convertible."

Nissan began formally marketing the CrossCabriolet with the 2011 model year — without further refreshes or any other trim levels during its production run. The crossover was only offered in the LE trim and had the same engine as a standard Murano.

The fully automatic, hydraulically operated cloth top has an automatic power latch/unlatch system, rear glass skylight, dual pop-up roll bars, 220 L (7.6 cu ft) cf cargo capacity with the top down and 350 L (12.3 cu ft) with the top up — and a Cd of 0.39. Its front doors are 200 mm (7.9 in) longer than four door Murano front doors, with structural reinforcement from the A-pillar rearward.

The Murano CrossCabriolet was discontinued after the 2014 model year.

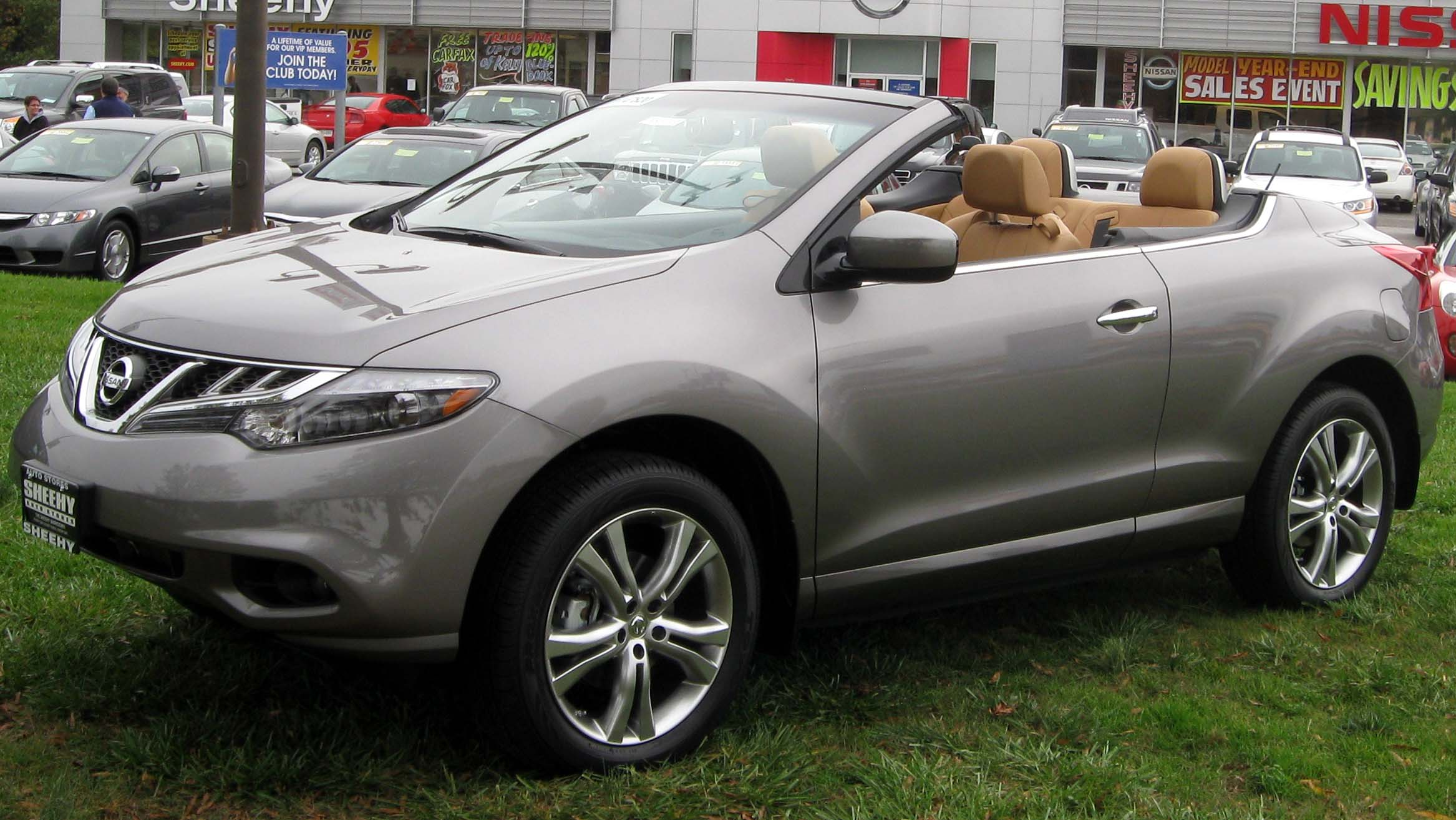
2011 Nissan Murano CrossCabriolet

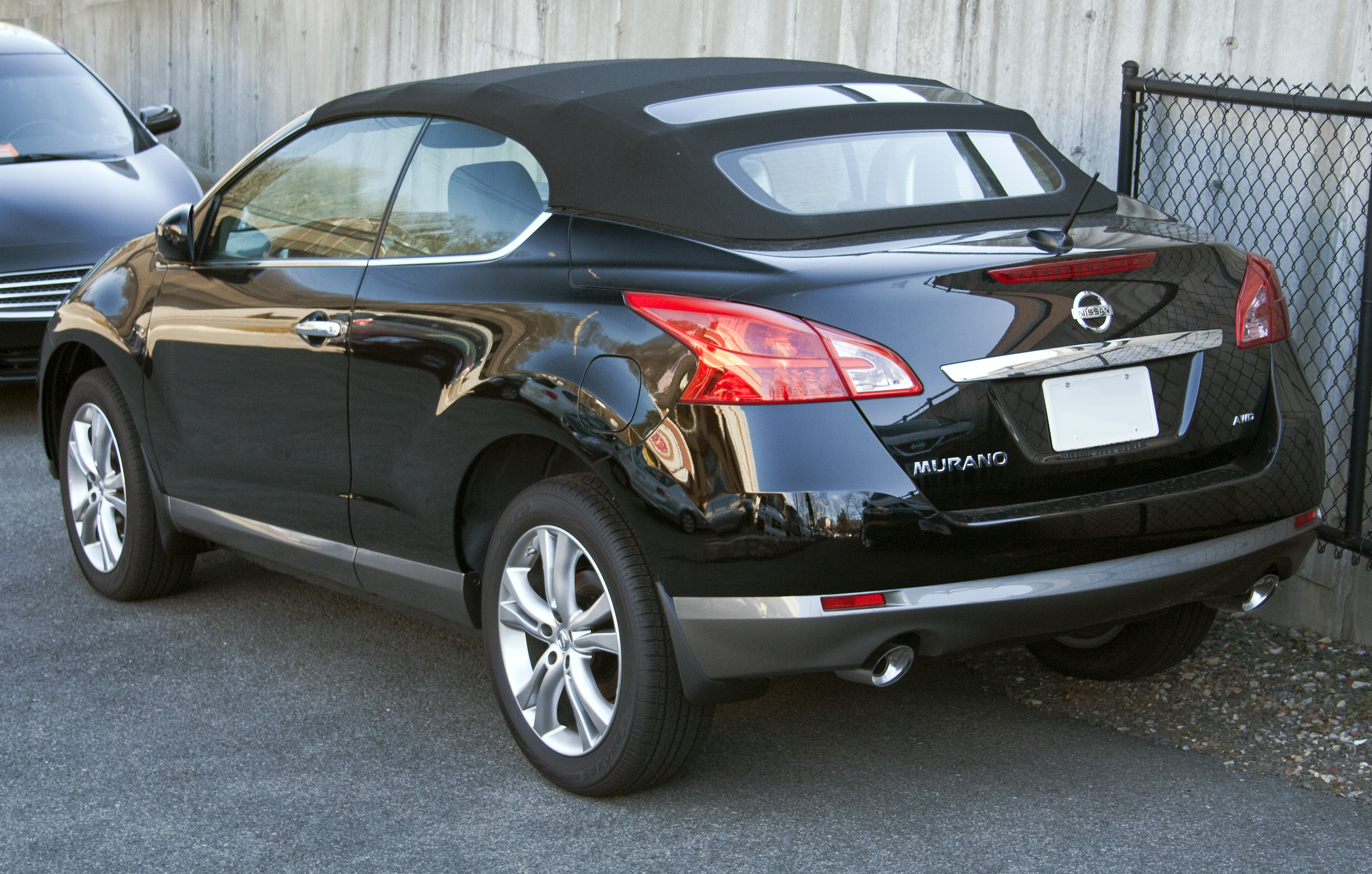
2012 Nissan Murano CrossCabriolet (rear)

=== Safety ===
Standard safety features on all trims include four wheel disc brakes with ABS, brake assist, and EBD; electronic stability control; and front, side, and side curtain airbags. The NHTSA awarded the second generation Murano four stars on the frontal crash test, and five stars for side impacts, worse than the first generation.

IIHS scores (2009 model year)
Moderate overlap front (original test)	Good
Side impact (original test)	Good
Roof strength	Marginal
Head restraints and seats	Good

== Third generation (Z52; 2015) ==
Third generation
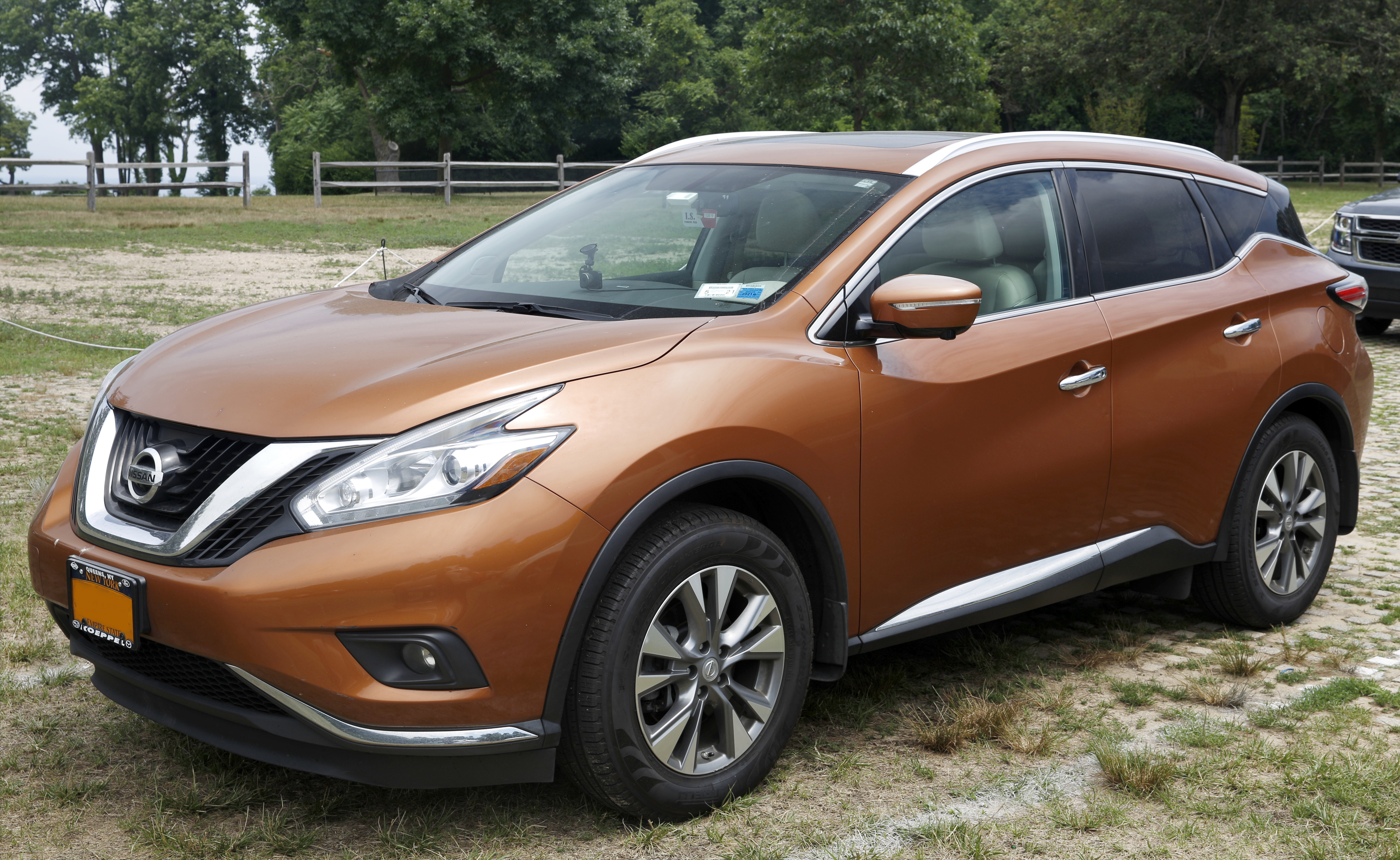
- 2015 Nissan Murano SL (pre-facelift, US)

Overview
- Model code: Z52
- Production: November 2014–December 2024
- Model years: 2015–2024; 2016 (Hybrid)
- Assembly: United States: Canton, Mississippi (2015–2020); Smyrna, Tennessee (Nissan Smyrna Assembly Plant: 2021–2024); China: Dalian (Dongfeng Nissan); Russia: Saint Petersburg
- Designer: Ken Lee

Body and chassis
- Body style: 5-door SUV
- Platform: Nissan D platform
- Related: Nissan Pathfinder (R52); Nissan Altima/Teana (L33); Nissan Maxima (A35); Infiniti JX/QX60 (L50)

Powertrain
- Engine: Gasoline: 2.5 L QR25DE I4 (China); 3.5 L VQ35DE V6; Gasoline hybrid: 2.5 L QR25DER I4
- Transmission: CVT; 6-speed automatic

Dimensions
- Wheelbase: 2,824 mm (111.2 in)
- Length: 4,887 mm (192.4 in)
- Width: 1,915 mm (75.4 in)
- Height: 1,689 mm (66.5 in)

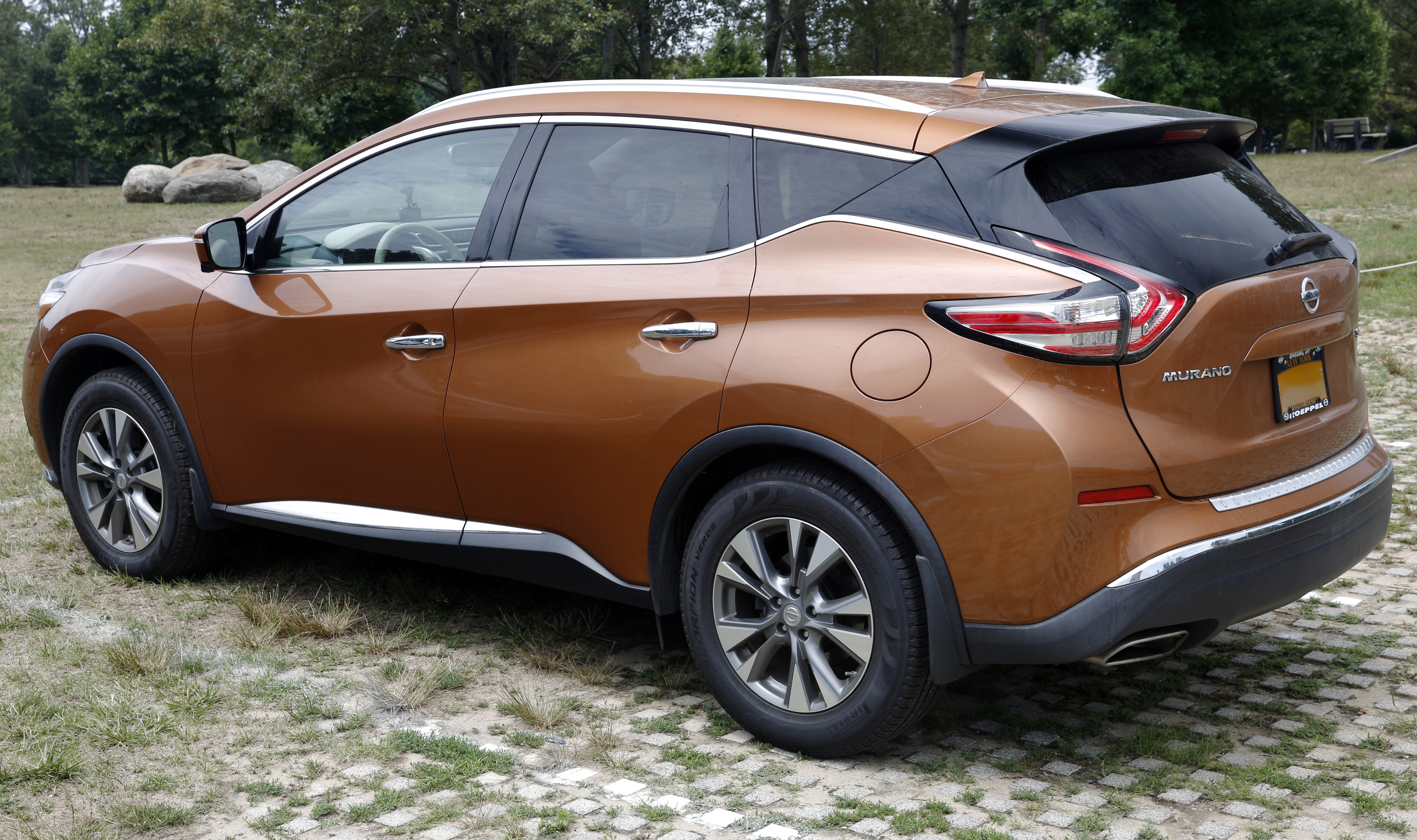
Rear view (pre-facelift)

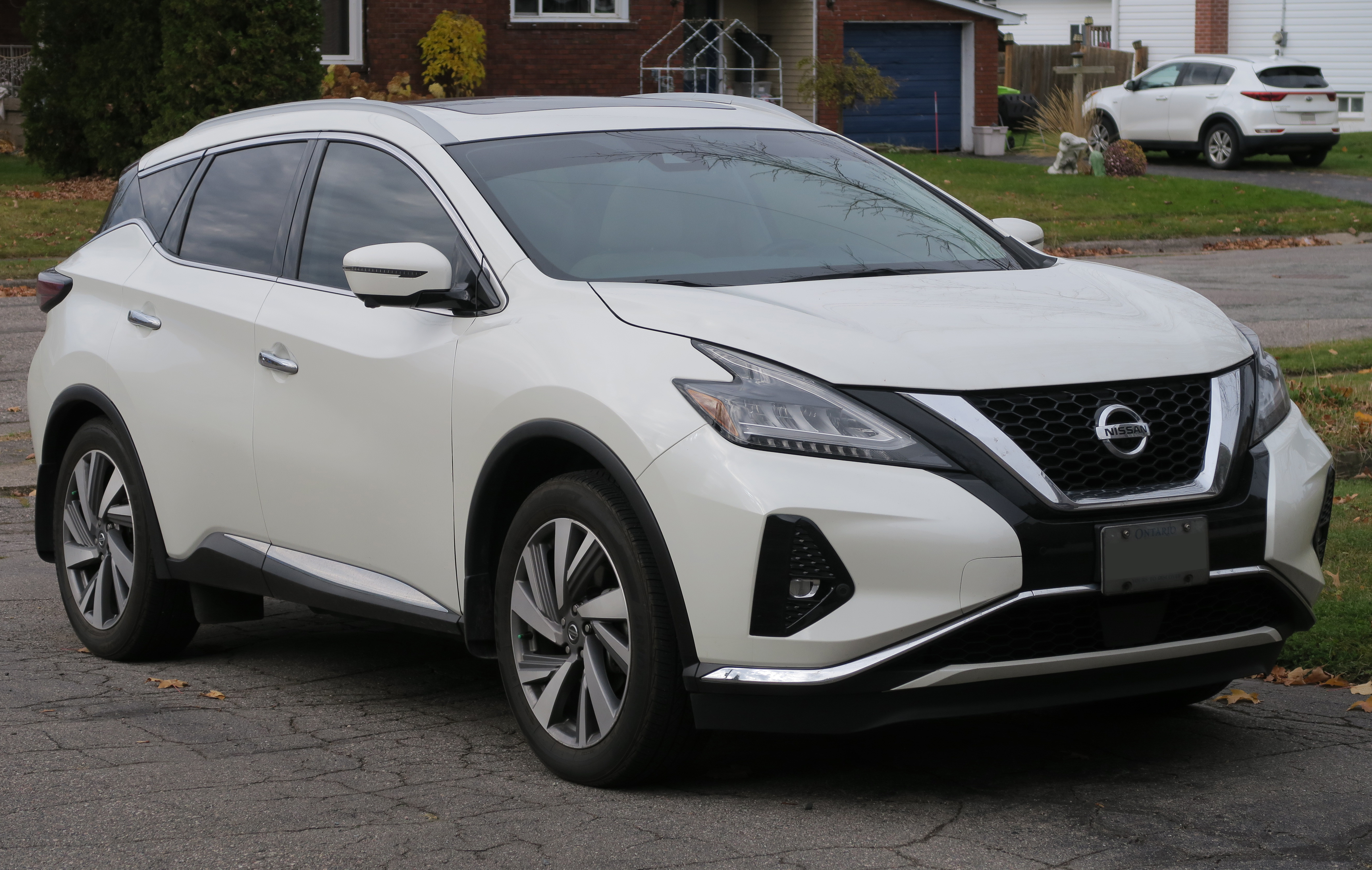
2020 Nissan Murano SL (facelift, Canada)

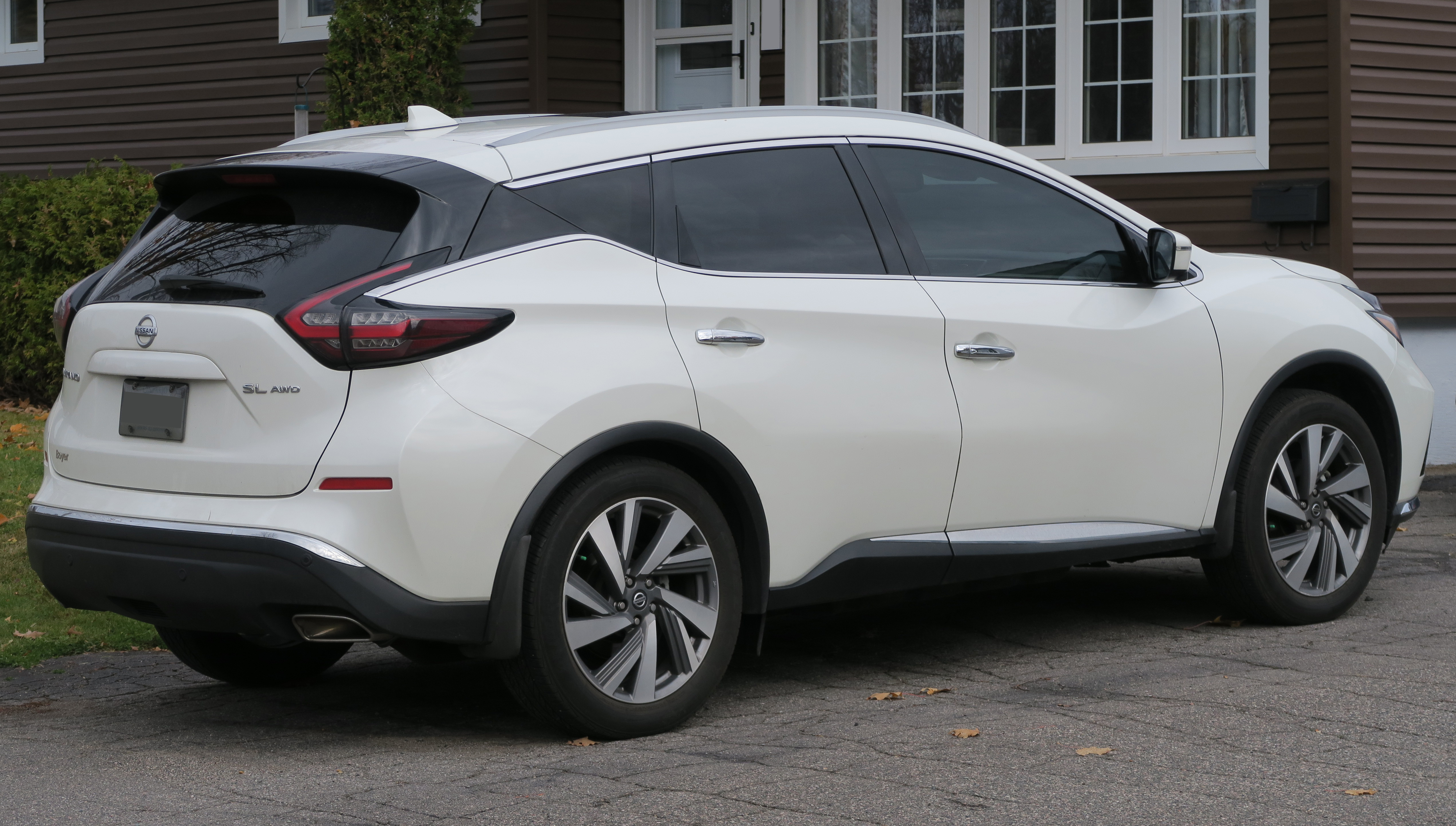
Rear view (facelift)

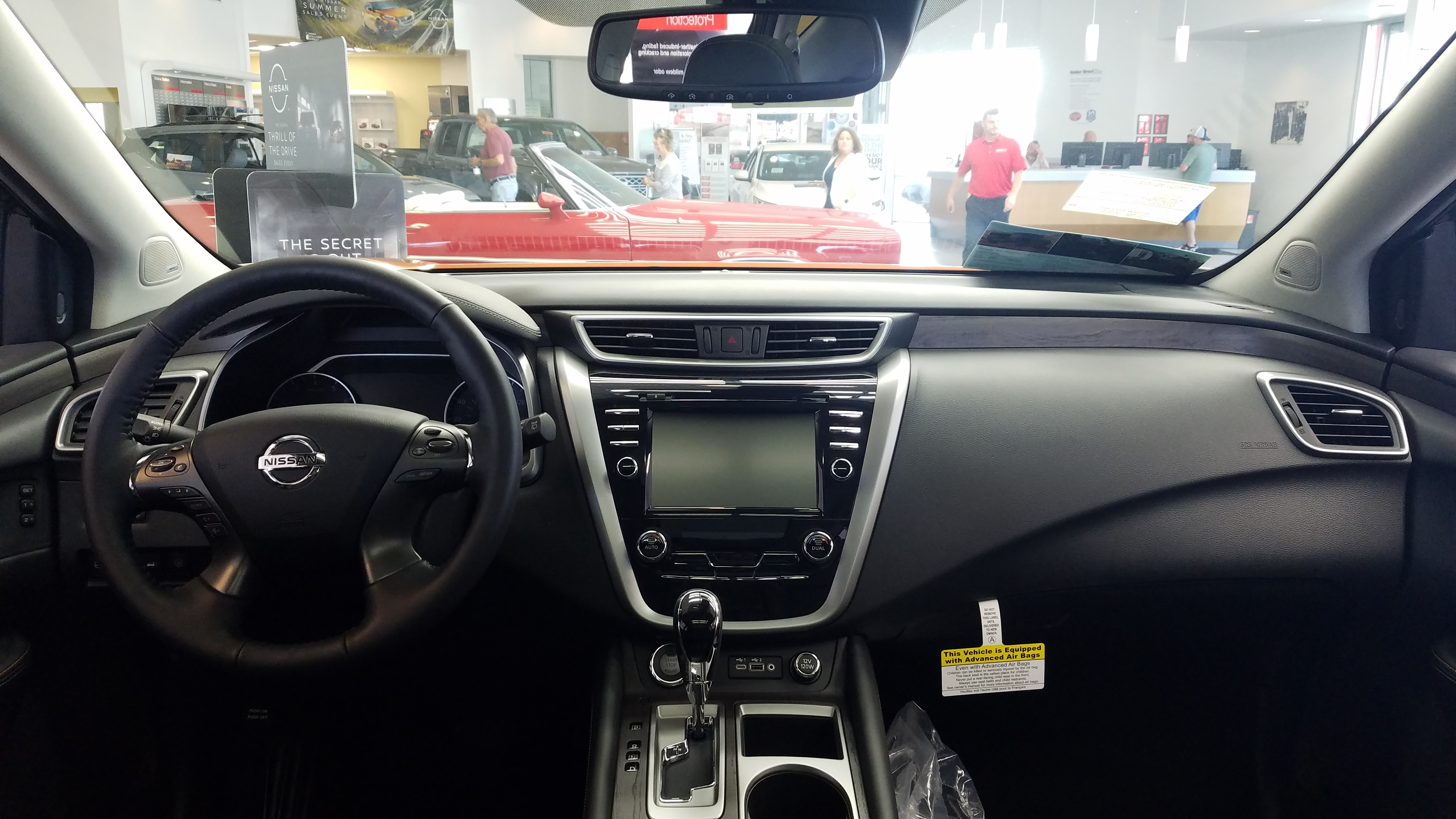
Interior (facelift)

In April 2014, Nissan unveiled the third generation Murano at the New York International Auto Show, with production in Canton, Mississippi and featuring the VQ-Series 3.5-liter V6 which produces up to 260 hp (194 kW).

The third-generation Murano is not marketed in Japan, Australia and New Zealand, as it is not produced in right-hand drive. The nameplate was discontinued in those regions due to sluggish sales, with the more compact X-Trail taking its place.

The Nissan Murano made a return in Mexico on April 11, 2018, as a 2019 model, after an absence for a decade after the second generation was discontinued in that market. For the Mexican market, it is offered only in the Advance and Exclusive trim lines and only offered in a V6 3.5-liter engine. The Murano was facelifted in Mexico in February 2020, dropping the Advance trim line and being only offered in the Platinum AWD trim line.

=== Murano Hybrid (2016) ===
For the model year of 2016, Nissan introduced a hybrid version of the Murano. The Murano Hybrid was available in two trim levels, SL and Platinum. The Murano Hybrid features an electric motor, a 2.5-liter four cylinder engine, Intelligent Dual Clutch System, and a lithium-ion battery that is located under the center console. Hybrid components does not reduce passenger and cargo space. The hybrid version uses the so-called VSP (Vehicle Sound for Pedestrians) system that uses sound to help alert pedestrians of the presence of the vehicle, when it is being driven at a low speed in the electric drive mode.

=== Markets ===
==== North America ====
For the 2019 model year, Murano received an updated front and rear fascias as well as a new wheel design and quilted semi-aniline leather appointed seating became standard on the Platinum trim level and also gets new interior trim finishers, Light wood-tone on SV and SL trim levels with cashmere interior, Metallic trim on S, SV, and SL trim levels with graphite interior, and Dark wood-tone on the Platinum trim level. New exterior colors include Deep Blue Pearl, Mocha Almond Pearl, and Sunset Drift ChromaFlair.

For the 2020 model year, it kept the same design while receiving minimal changes, mostly safety features. The SV and SL models received the Nissan Safety Shield 360 as standard, which included automatic emergency braking with pedestrian detection, blind spot warning, rear cross-traffic alert, lane departure warning, rear automatic braking, and high-beam assist.

Since 2020, Murano production in North America shifted from Canton, Mississippi to the Nissan Smyrna Assembly Plant in Tennessee.

For the 2021 model year, Nissan's "Safety Shield 360" became standard on all Murano trim levels. A Special Edition package was offered on the SV trim level with 20-inch dark charcoal wheels, leatherette seats, special badging, heated front seats, and a dual panel panoramic moonroof.

For the 2022 model year, a Midnight Edition appearance package replaced the Special Edition package for the SV trim, featuring a black grille, exterior trim pieces, and black painted 20-inch aluminum alloy wheels.

For the 2023 model year, two new exterior paint colors were added: Super Black and Deep Ocean Blue Pearl.

For the 2024 model year, the base S trim was dropped, making the SV trim the entry grade.

==== China ====
For China, the Nissan Murano sold by Dongfeng Nissan is offered in the XE, XL, XL Plus and S/C trim lines and only offered in a 2.5-liter engine.

==== Russia ====
The Russian model is offered in five trim lines; Mid, High, High+, Top, and Top+.

=== Safety ===
It has ventilated disc brakes on all wheels.

==== IIHS ====
The 2015 model year Murano was awarded "Top Safety Pick+" by the US IIHS.

IIHS scores (2015 model year)
Small overlap front (driver)	Good	
Moderate overlap front (original test)	Good	
Side impact (original test)	Good	
Roof strength	Good	
Head restraints and seats	Good	
Front crash prevention: vehicle-to-pedestrian	Superior	Optional system
Child restraint LATCH ease of use	Acceptable	

==== Latin NCAP ====
The US-made Murano in its most basic Latin American market configuration with 7 airbags received 2 stars for adult occupants and 4 stars for toddlers from Latin NCAP 2.0 in 2016.

Latin NCAP 2.0 test results Nissan Murano + 7 Airbags (2016, based on Euro NCAP 2008)
Test	Points	Stars
Adult occupant:	22.81/34.0	2 /5 stars
Child occupant:	35.22/49.00	4 /5 stars

The updated US-made Murano in its most basic Latin American market configuration with 7 airbags received 5 stars for adult occupants and 3 stars for toddlers from Latin NCAP 2.0 in 2017.

Latin NCAP 2.0 test results Nissan Murano + 7 Airbags (from 06/10/2017) (2017, based on Euro NCAP 2008)
Test	Points	Stars
Adult occupant:	28.72/34.0	5 /5 stars
Child occupant:	34.66/49.00	3 /5 stars

== Fourth generation (Z53; 2025) ==
Fourth generation
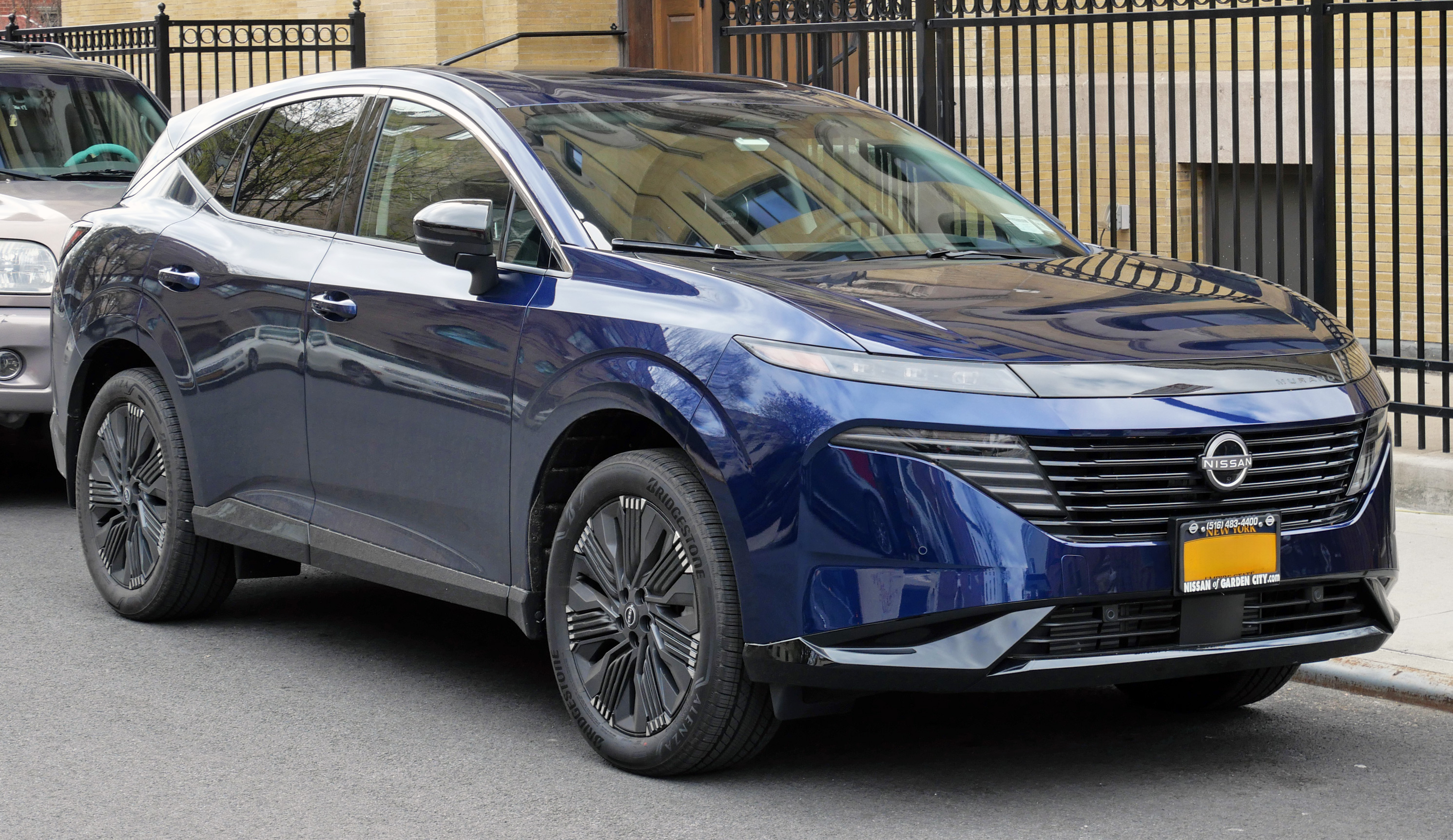
- 2025 Nissan Murano Platinum (US)

Overview
- Model code: Z53
- Production: December 2024–present
- Model years: 2025–present
- Assembly: United States: Smyrna, Tennessee (Nissan Smyrna Assembly Plant)
- Designer: Giovanny Arroba

Body and chassis
- Body style: Five-door SUV
- Layout: Front engine, front-wheel drive / all-wheel drive
- Platform: Nissan D platform
- Related: Nissan Pathfinder (R53); Nissan Altima (L34); Infiniti QX60 (L51)

Powertrain
- Engine: 2.0 L KR20DDET turbo I4 (gasoline)
- Power output: 241 hp (180 kW; 244 PS)
- Transmission: 9-speed automatic

Dimensions
- Wheelbase: 2,825 mm (111.2 in)
- Length: 4,900 mm (192.9 in)
- Width: 1,980 mm (78.0 in)
- Height: 1,725 mm (67.9 in)
- Curb weight: 1,945–1,990 kg (4,288.0–4,387.2 lb)

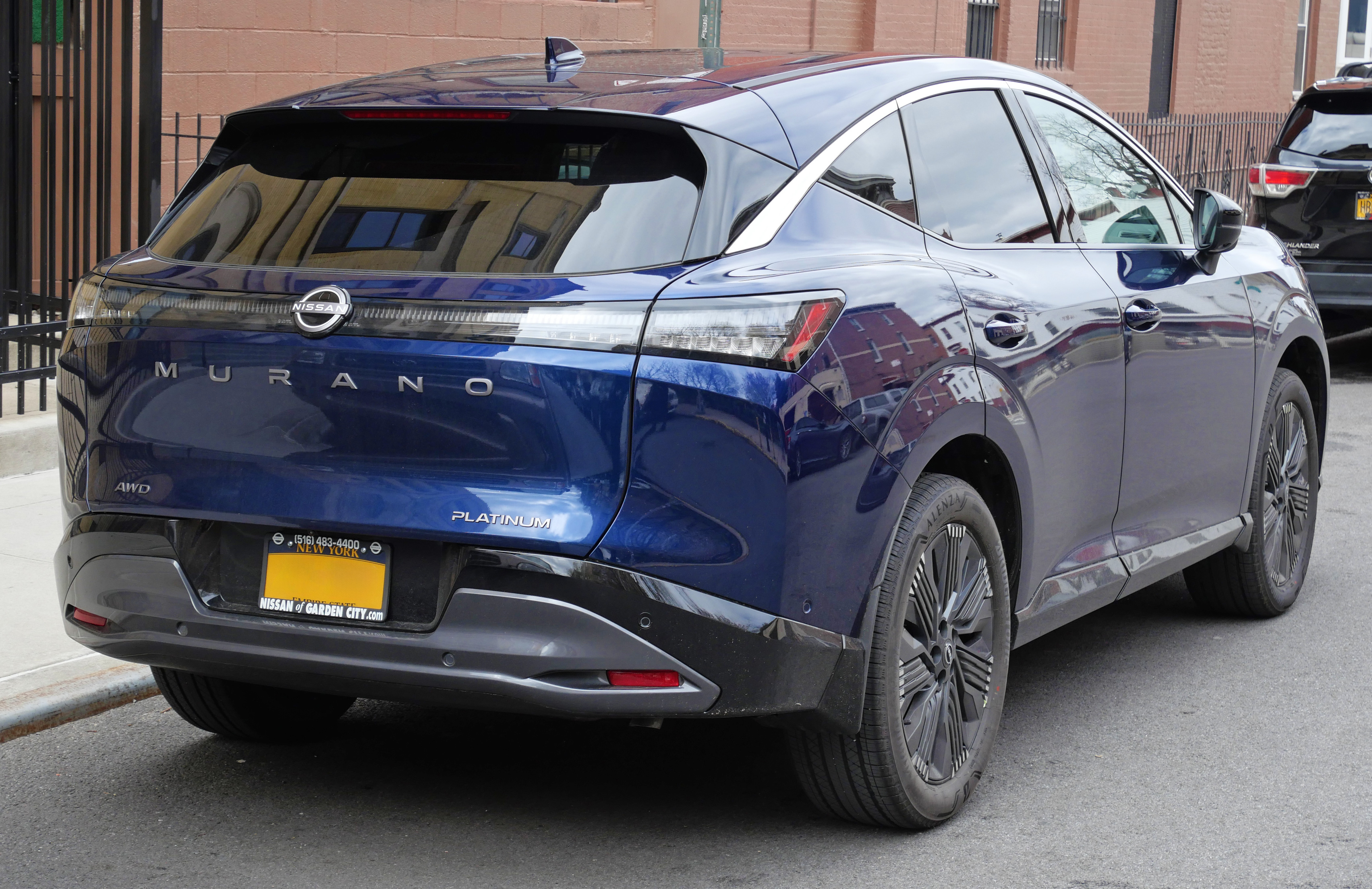
Rear view

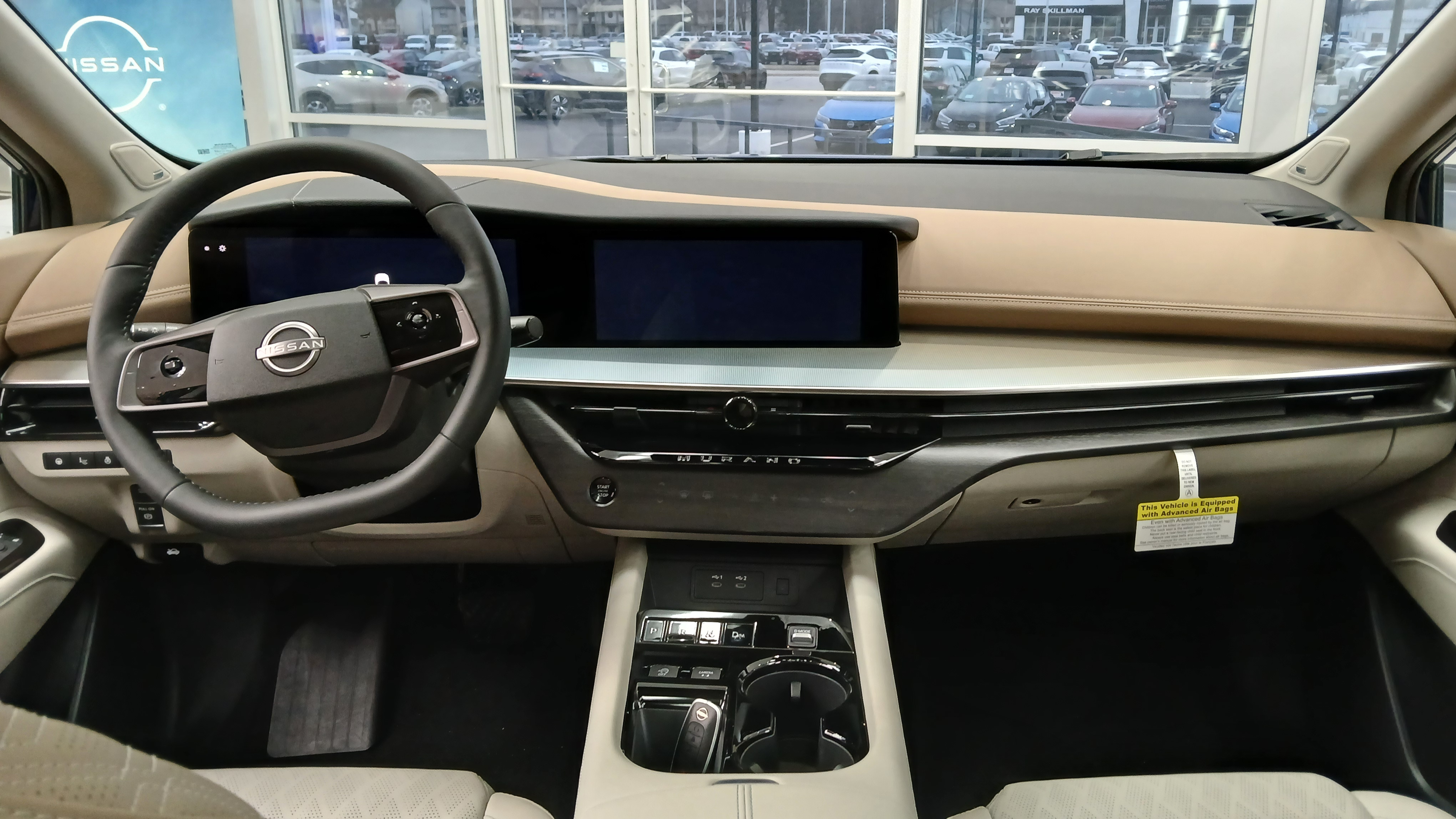
Interior

The fourth-generation Murano was unveiled on October 16, 2024, for the 2025 model year. The updated model bears a strong resemblance to the Ariya electric crossover, and incorporates many modern features that were not previously available on the Murano, including ventilated and massaging front seats, dual 12.3-inch instrument cluster and infotainment displays, wireless Apple CarPlay and Android Auto connectivity, Nissan ProPilot Assist 1.0 and 1.1, and a color heads-up display.

The powertrain consisting of a 3.5-liter Nissan VQ35DE V6 engine and a continuously variable transmission used on all previous generations of the Murano has been replaced with a 2.0-liter turbocharged Nissan KR20DDET engine with variable compression technology, shared with the Nissan Altima and Infiniti QX50. It is the first Nissan model to pair this engine with a nine-speed automatic transmission. Intended for the North American market, the 2025 Murano is available in SV, SL, and Platinum trim levels. The Murano SV model is available in both front-wheel drive and all-wheel drive configurations, while SL and Platinum grades are available exclusively in an all-wheel drive configuration.

The front-wheel drive configuration was discontinued for 2026, with all Muranos having all-wheel drive as standard.

For the 2027 model year, the base SV trim was discontinued, while a new Dark Armor trim, slotted betwen the SL and platinum trim levels, was added.

The Murano was reintroduced in Japan on June 3, 2026, where it is imported from the US in left-hand drive configuration. It is offered in sole SV trim with the KR20DDET engine and AWD is standard.

=== Safety ===
The 2025 model year Murano was awarded "Top Safety Pick+" by the US IIHS.

IIHS scores (2025 model year)
Small overlap front	Good	
Moderate overlap front (updated test)	Good	
Side impact (updated test)	Good	
Headlights	Acceptable	
Front crash prevention: vehicle-to-pedestrian	Superior	Standard system
Seatbelt reminders	Good	
Child restraint LATCH ease of use	Good+	

== Sales ==
Calendar year	United States	Canada	China	Europe	Russia	Australia
2002	2,054					
2003	56,075			87		
2004	62,057			85		
2005	74,454	4,514		8,288		
2006	81,362	5,062		5,355		
2007	76,358	4,159		2,551		
2008	71,401	4,557		1,969		
2009	52,546	3,691		1,710		
2010	53,999	3,798		1,943		
2011	53,626	4,862	858	3,108		
2012	51,675	4,303	946	1,741		2,145
2013	44,684	3,384	377	1,164		
2014	47,301	4,706	208	625		551
2015	62,907	10,128	12,421	603	1,535	
2016	86,953	13,834	20,537	64	1,722	
2017	76,732	15,120	25,473	2	2,851	
2018	83,547	13,239	27,865	1	3,409	
2019	68,361	12,000	23,547		3,367	
2020	58,255	8,091	15,576		2,815	
2021	46,117	6,852	12,082		2,617	
2022	30,074	3,419	6,805		689	
2023	31,137	4,411				
2024	19,316	3,271				
2025	42,747	3,542				
