= Stazione Sperimentale Carta, Cartoni e Paste per Carta =

Italian research institute

45°28′36.5″N 9°13′35.1″E

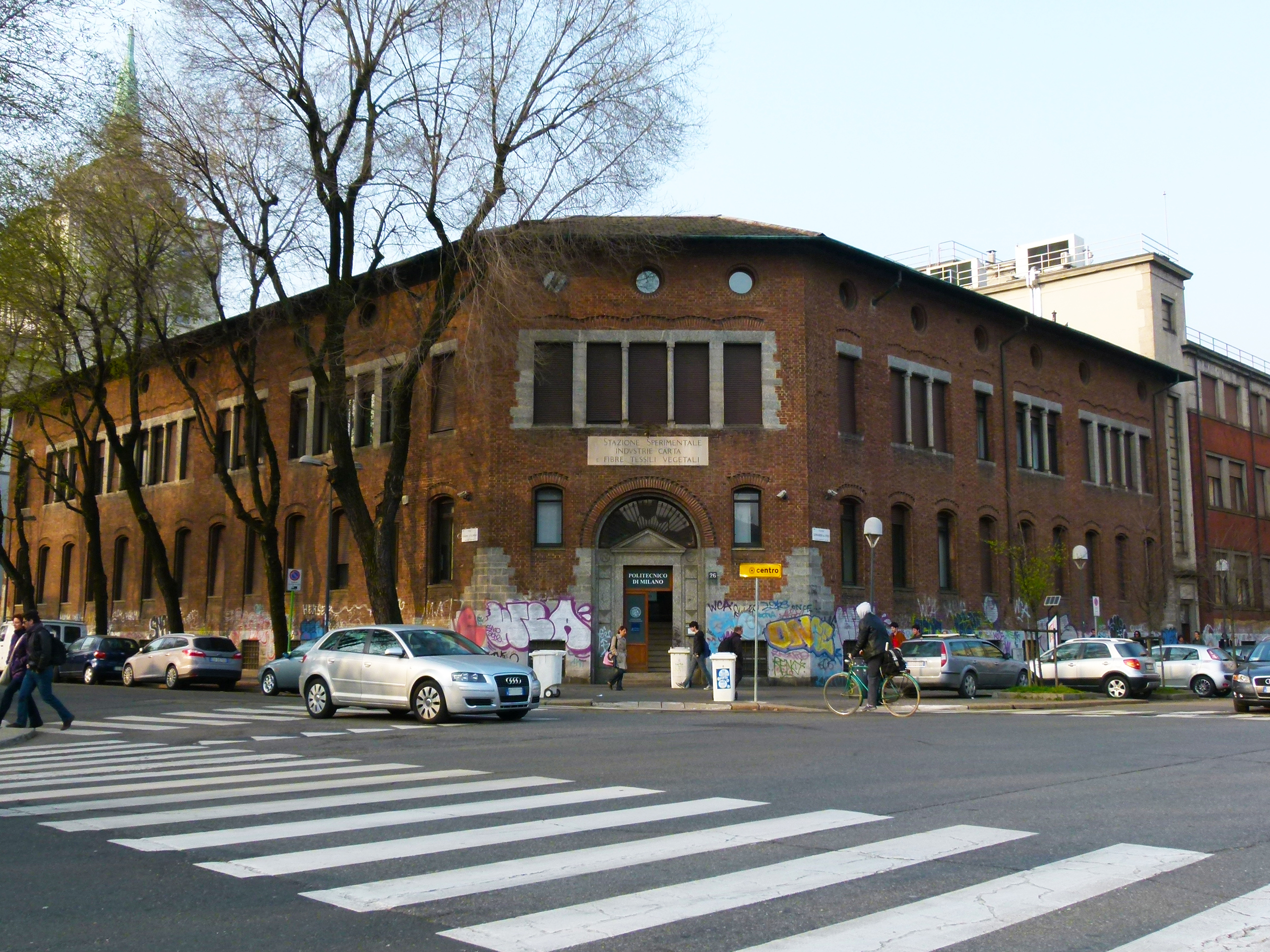
Pulp and Paper Experimental Station

The Stazione Sperimentale Carta, Cartoni e Paste per Carta (SSCCP) (Pulp and Paper Experimental Station) is a special Agency of the Chamber of Commerce in Milan. It is an Institute for applied research, established in Milan, and operating on a national scale with the specific aim of promoting the technical and technological progress in the pulp, paper and derived products industry. In 1999 SSCCP was transformed into a public economic institution with important legal, operational and administrative modifications which, however, have left its mission and functions unchanged.

== See also ==
- Stazione Sperimentale per le Industrie degli Oli e dei Grassi
- Stazione Sperimentale per la Seta
- Stazione Sperimentale per i Combustibili
