= Stazione Sperimentale per l'Industria delle Pelli e delle Materie Concianti =

Italian research institute

The Stazione Sperimentale per l'Industria delle Pelli e delle Materie Concianti (SSIP) (Leather and Tanning Materials Experimental Station) is a special Agency of the Chamber of Commerce in Naples. It is an Institute for applied research, established in Naples in 1885, and operating on a national scale with the specific aim of promoting the technical and technological progress in the leather, tanning materials and derived products industry. In 1999 SSIP was transformed into a public economic institution with important legal, operational and administrative modifications which, however, have left its mission and functions unchanged.

== See Also ==
- Stazione Sperimentale per le Industrie degli Oli e dei Grassi
- Stazione Sperimentale per la Seta
