= Murano Lighthouse =

Murano lighthouse
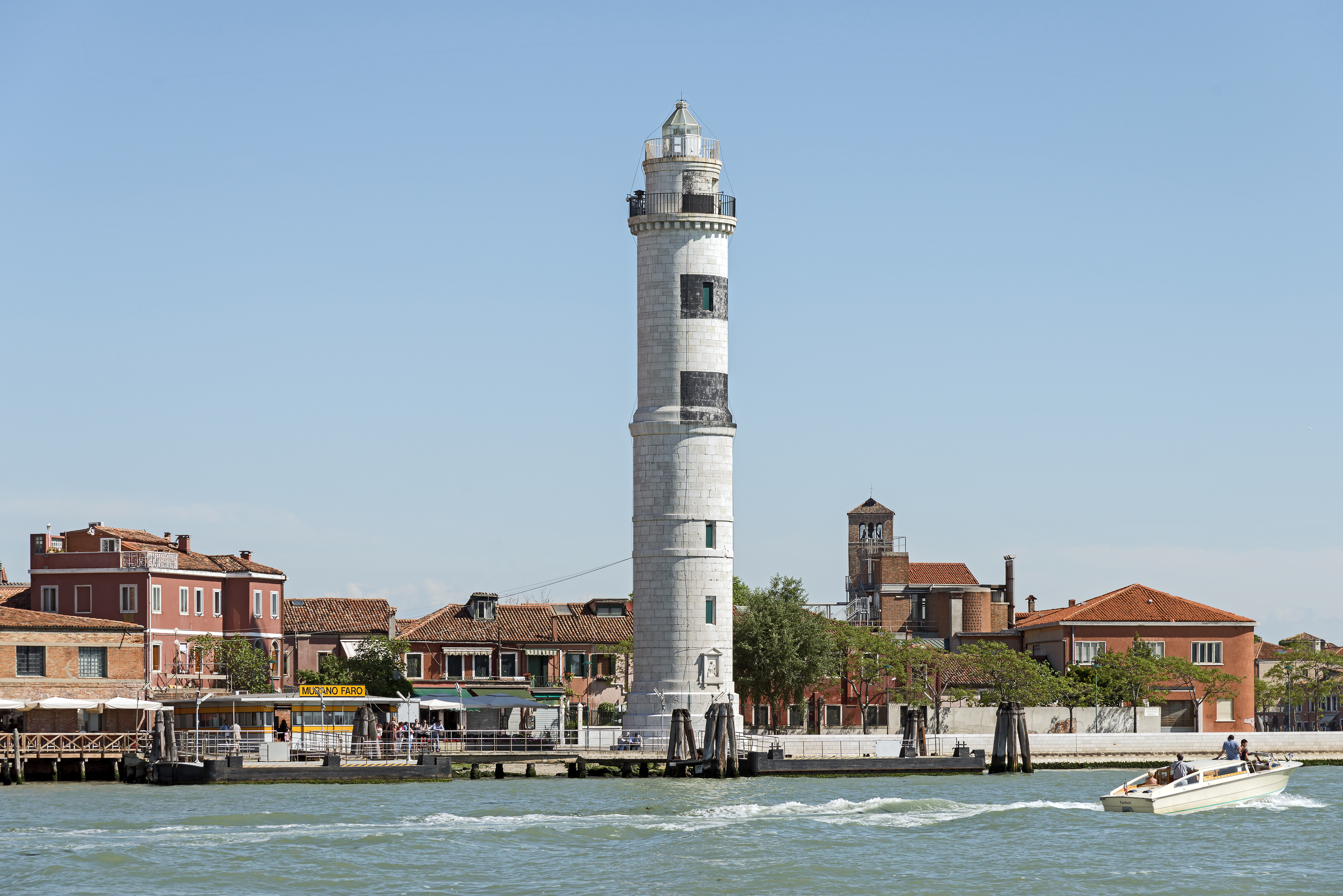
- Location: Murano, Veneto, Italy
- Coordinates: 45°27′10″N 12°21′17″E

Tower
- Constructed: 1912
- Construction: concrete (foundation), stone (tower)
- Height: 35 m (115 ft)
- Markings: White, Stripe (2, black, horizontal orientation)
- Power source: mains electricity
- Operator: Italian Navy

Murano Range Rear light
- First lit: 1934
- Focal height: 37 m (121 ft)
- Lens: Type TD 800; Focal length: 400mm
- Range: 20 nmi (37 km; 23 mi) (main light), 17 nmi (31 km; 20 mi) (auxiliary light)
- Characteristic: Oc W 6s
- Italy no.: 4177.2 E.F

Murano Directional light
- Focal height: 35 m (115 ft)
- Lens: Type PD
- Range: 20 nmi (37 km; 23 mi)
- Characteristic: Fl W 6s
- Italy no.: 4177.1 E.F

Murano Lighthouse (Italian: Faro dell'Isola di Murano) is an active lighthouse located in the south east part of the island of Murano in the Venetian Lagoon on the Adriatic Sea.

== Description ==
The first lighthouse, built in 1912, was a metal skeletal tower on piles, which was deactivated in 1934 when the current iteration became operational. The lighthouse consists of a two-stages cylindrical stone tower, 35 metres (115 ft) high, with double balcony and lantern. The tower is painted white, on the upper stage are painted two black horizontal bands facing the range line, on the east side, in order to have the lighthouse more visible during the day.

The Range Rear light is positioned at 37 metres (121 ft) above sea level and emits an occulting white light in a 6 seconds period, visible up to a distance of 17 nautical miles (31 km; 20 mi). The lighthouse is completely automated and managed by the Marina Militare with the identification code number 4177.2 E.F.

The Directional light is positioned at 35 metres (115 ft) above sea level and emits one white flash in a 6 seconds period, visible up to a distance of 20 nautical miles (37 km; 23 mi). The lighthouse is completely automated and managed by the Marina Militare with the identification code number 4177.1 E.F.

== See also ==
- List of lighthouses in Italy
- Murano
