= Murano =

Series of islands in the Venetian Lagoon, Italy

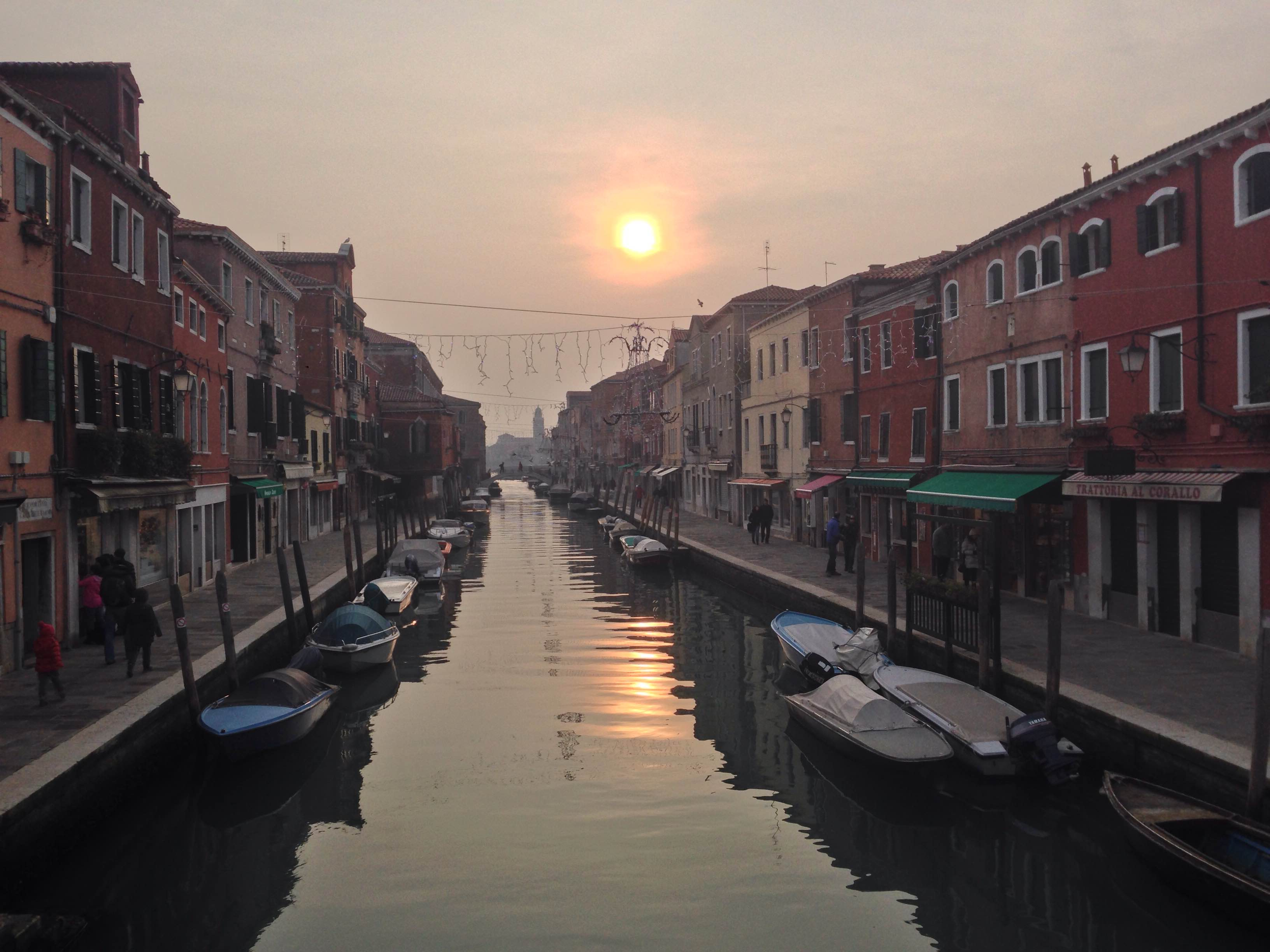
- Rio dei Vetrai, Murano (2015)

- Location within Italy

Geography
- Coordinates: 45°27′27″N 12°21′13″E
- Adjacent to: Venetian Lagoon

Administration
- Italy
- Region: Veneto
- Province: Province of Venice

Murano is a series of islands linked by bridges in the Venetian Lagoon, northern Italy. It lies about 1.5 km (1 mi) north of Venice, Italy, and measures about 1.5 km (1 mi) across with a population of just over 5,000 (2004 figures). It is famous for its glass making. It was once an independent comune, but is now a frazione of the comune of Venice.

== History ==
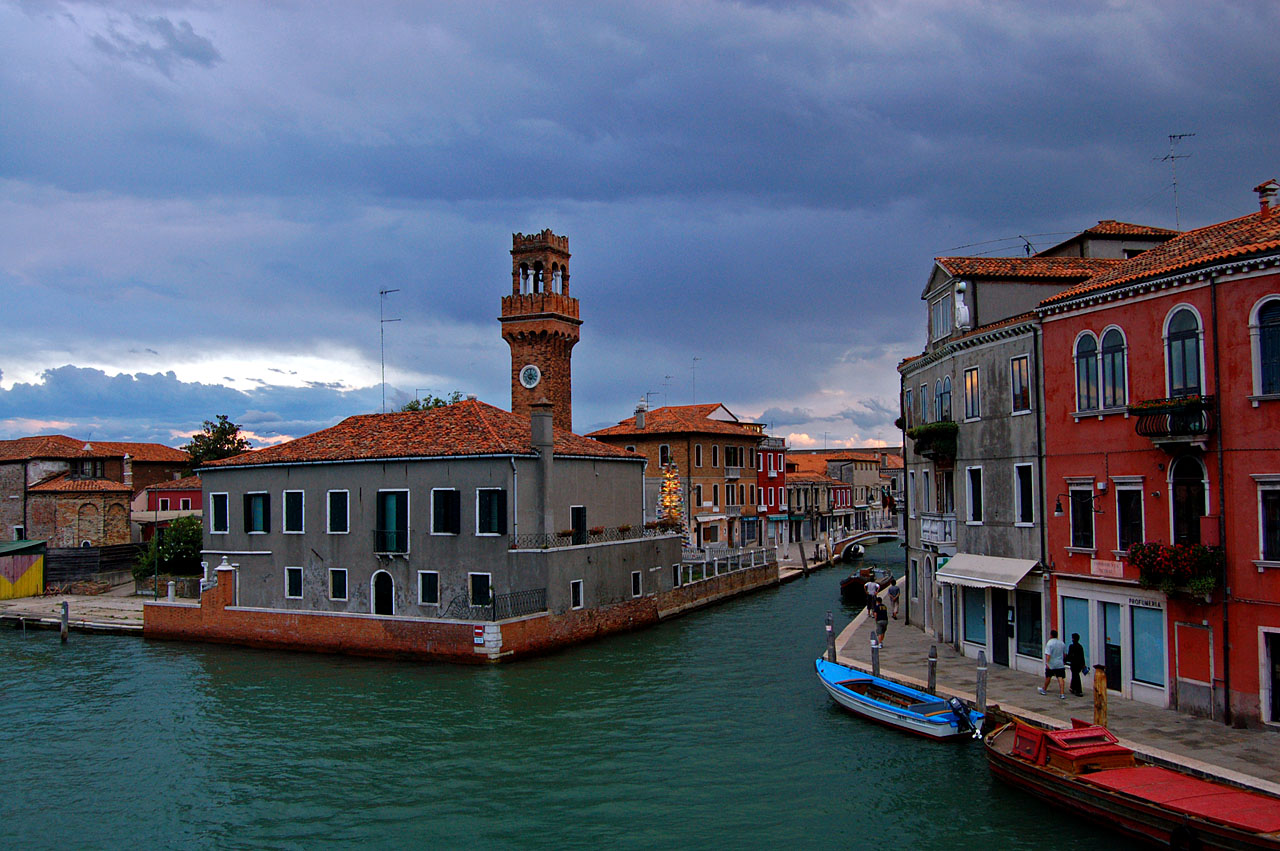
View from a bridge on Murano, overlooking the Canal Grande di Murano

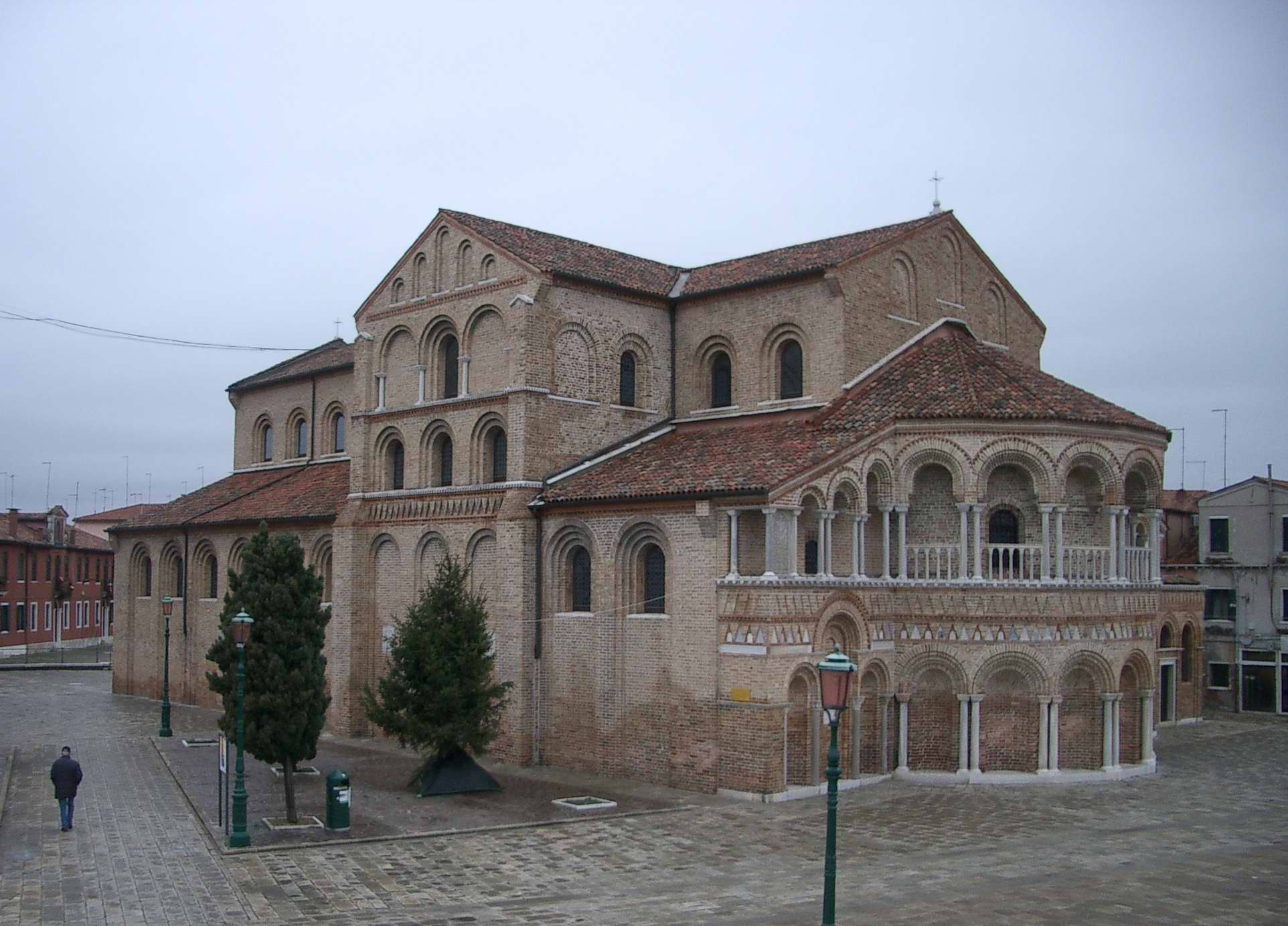
Church of Santa Maria e San Donato, Murano

Murano was initially settled by the Romans and from the sixth century by people from Altinum and Oderzo. At first, the island prospered as a fishing port and through its production of salt. It was also a centre for trade through the port it controlled on Sant'Erasmo. From the eleventh century, it began to decline as islanders moved to Dorsoduro. It had a Grand Council, like that of Venice, but from the thirteenth century, Murano was ultimately governed by a podestà from Venice. Unlike the other islands in the Lagoon, Murano minted its own coins.

Early in the second millennium hermits of the Camaldolese Order occupied one of the islands, seeking a place of solitude for their way of life. There they founded the Monastery of St. Michael (Italian: S. Michele di Murano). This monastery became a great center of learning and printing. The famous cartographer, Fra Mauro, whose maps were crucial to the European exploration of the world, was a monk of this community. The monastery was suppressed in 1810 by French forces under Napoleon, in the course of their conquest of the Italian Peninsula, and the monks were expelled in 1814. The grounds then became Venice's major cemetery.

In 1291, all the glassmakers in Venice were required to move to Murano. In the following century, exports began, and the island became famous, initially for glass beads and mirrors. Aventurine glass was invented on the island, and for a while Murano was the main producer of glass in Europe. The island later became known for chandeliers. Although decline set in during the eighteenth century, glassmaking is still the island's main industry.

In the fifteenth century, the island became popular as a resort for Venetians, and palaces were built, but this later declined. The countryside of the island was known for its orchards and vegetable gardens until the nineteenth century, when more housing was built.

Attractions on the island include the Church of Santa Maria e San Donato (known for its twelfth-century Byzantine mosaic pavement and said to house the bones of the dragon slain by Saint Donatus in the 4th century), the church of San Pietro Martire with the chapel of the Ballarin family built in 1506 and artworks by Giovanni Bellini, and the Palazzo da Mula. Glass-related attractions include the many glassworks, some Mediaeval and most open to the public, and the Murano Glass Museum, housed in the large Palazzo Giustinian.

== Murano glassmaking ==
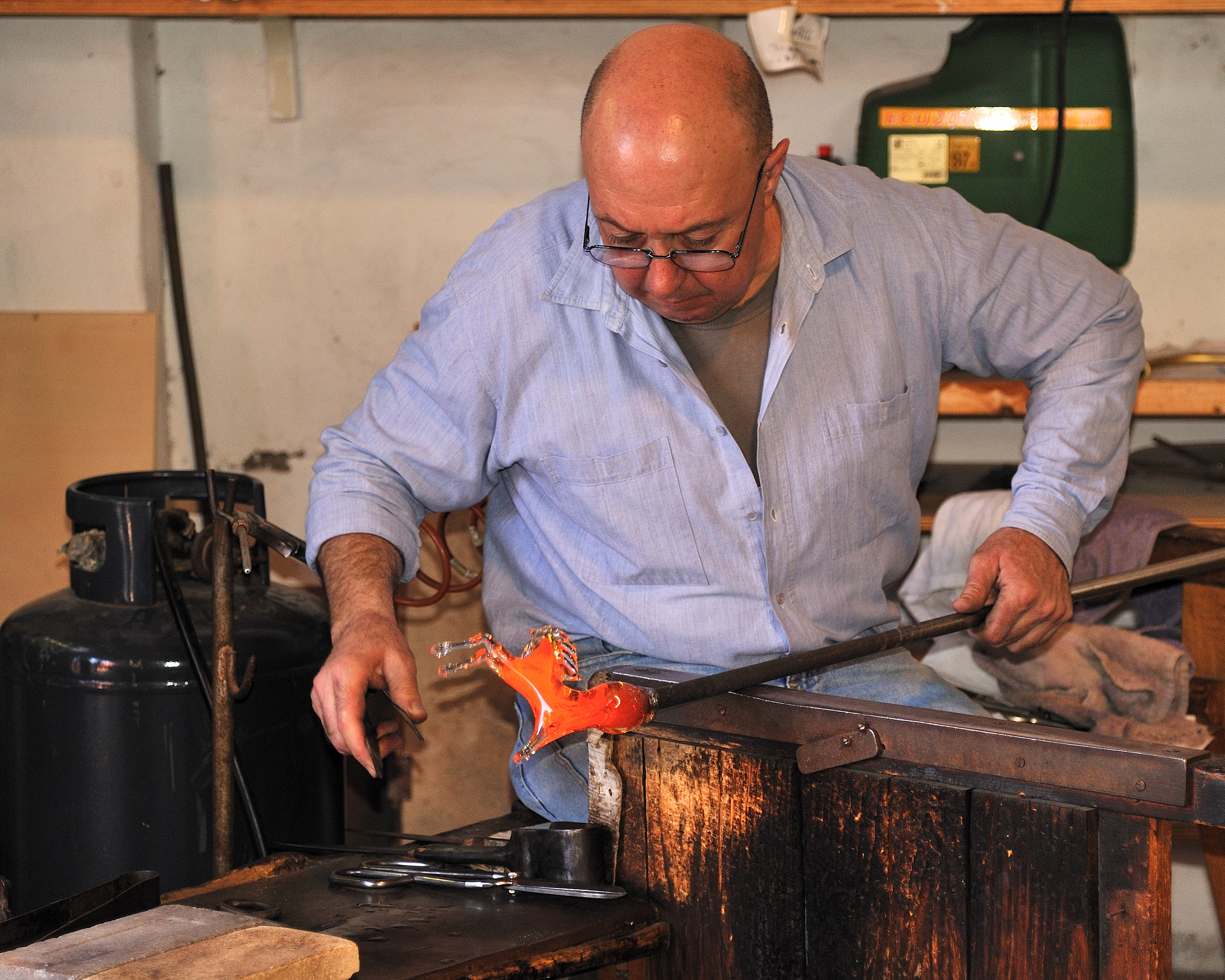
Glass making in Murano

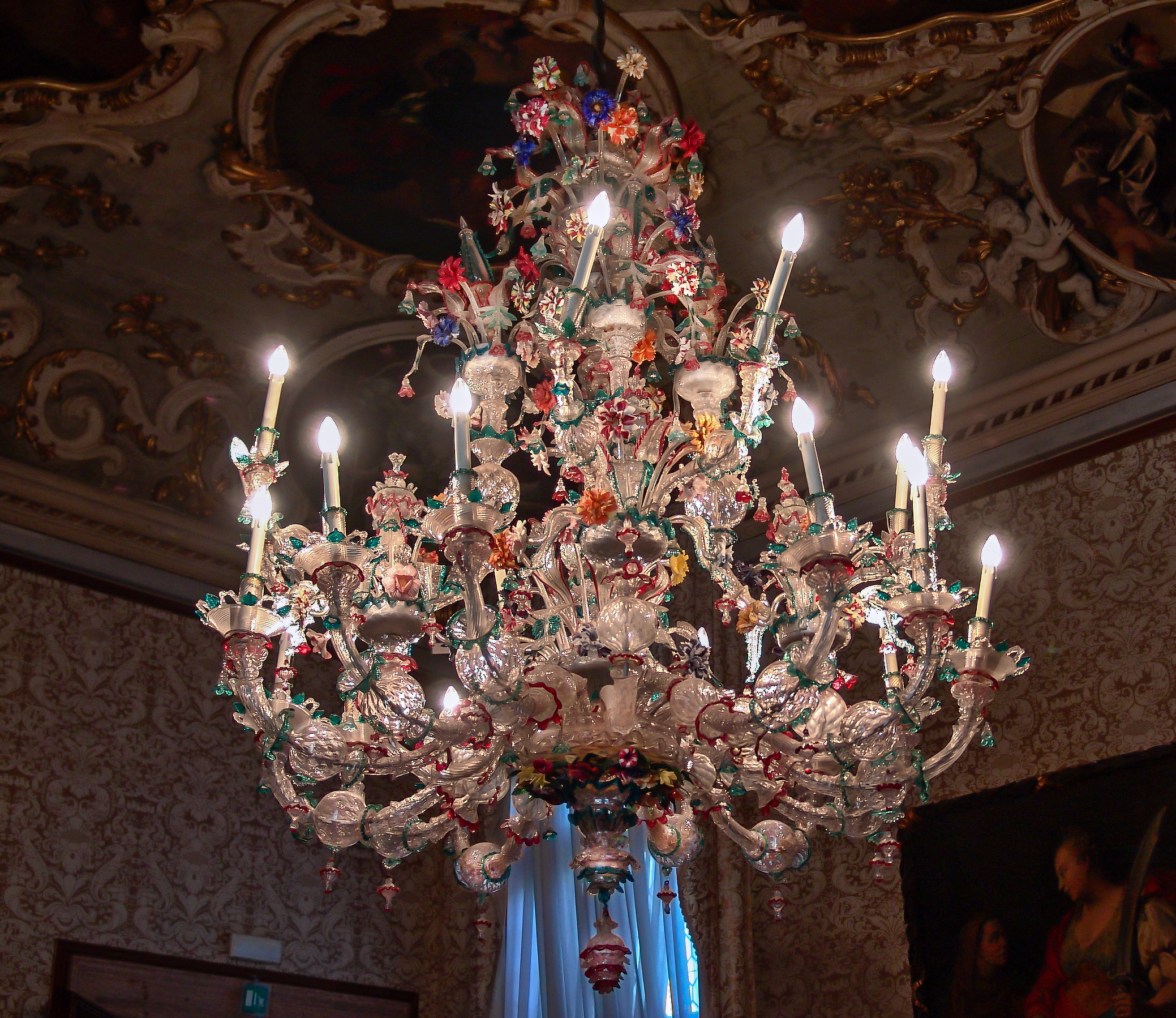
Chandelier in Murano glass

Murano's reputation as a center for glassmaking was born when the Venetian Republic, fearing fire and the destruction of the city's mostly wooden buildings, ordered glassmakers to move their furnaces to Murano in 1291. Murano glass is still associated with Venetian glass.

Murano's glassmakers were soon numbered among the island's most prominent citizens. By the fourteenth century, glassmakers were allowed to wear swords, enjoyed immunity from prosecution by the Venetian state and found their daughters married into Venice's most affluent families. While benefiting from certain statutory privileges, glassmakers were forbidden to leave the Republic. However, many of them took the risks associated with migration and established glass furnaces in surrounding cities and farther afield — sometimes in England and the Netherlands.

Murano's glassmakers held a monopoly on high-quality glassmaking for centuries, developing or refining many technologies including optically clear glass, enamelled glass (smalto), glass with threads of gold (aventurine), multicolored glass (millefiori), milk glass (lattimo), and imitation gemstones made of glass. Today, the artisans of Murano still employ these centuries-old techniques, crafting everything from contemporary art glass and glass jewellery to Murano glass chandeliers and wine stoppers.

Venice kept protecting the secret of the production of glass and of crystal but, notwithstanding it, the Republic partially lost its monopoly at the end of the sixteenth century, because of some glass makers who let the secret be known in many European countries.

Today, Murano is home to the Museo del Vetro or Murano Glass Museum in the Palazzo Giustinian, which holds displays on the history of glassmaking as well as glass samples ranging from Egyptian times through the present day.

Some of the companies that own historical glass factories in Murano are among the most important brands of glass in the world. These companies include Venini, Alessandro Mandruzzato Ferro Murano, Barovier & Toso, Simone Cenedese and Seguso. To protect the original Murano Glass art from foreign markets, the most famous Glass Factories of this island have a trademark that certifies glass made products on the island of Murano.

The oldest Murano glass factory still active today is Pauly & C. – Compagnia Venezia Murano, founded in 1866.

=== Government protection ===
As part of a broader view of protection and enhancement of typical and traditional Veneto product manufacturing and marketing, the Veneto Region protects and promotes the designation of origin of artistic glassworks created on the island of Murano, since glasswork is an inherent part of Venetian historical and cultural heritage.

The "Vetro Artistico Murano" trademark, filed and registered at the European Office for Harmonisation in Alicante, no. 00481812, has been established and is regulated by Regional Law no. 70, 1994.

=== Link to Warsaw ===
In the seventeenth century, the Murano-born Simone Giuseppe Belotti (in Polish, Szymon Józef Bellotti) became Royal Architect to the King of Poland and took part in designing some of Warsaw's most important landmarks (pl:Józef Szymon Bellotti). The palace he built for himself was named after his native island, "Muranów" — a Polish pronunciation of "Murano". This palace eventually gave its name to the entire surrounding district. Muranów was and remains one of Warsaw's most well known areas, especially associated with the city's Jewish history.

== Geography ==
Murano is composed of seven islands in the Venetian Lagoon, linked by bridges over eight channels.

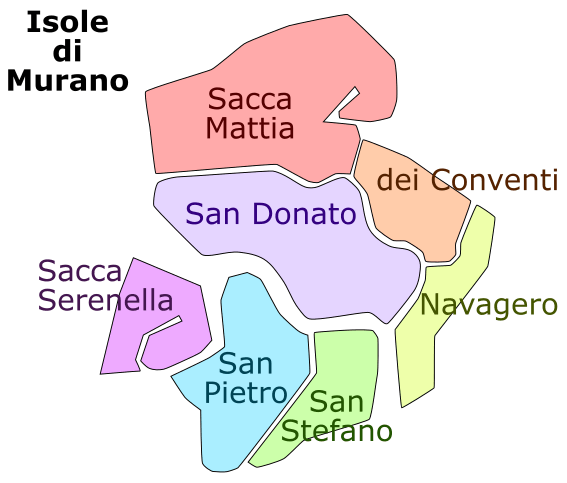
The seven individual islands of Murano

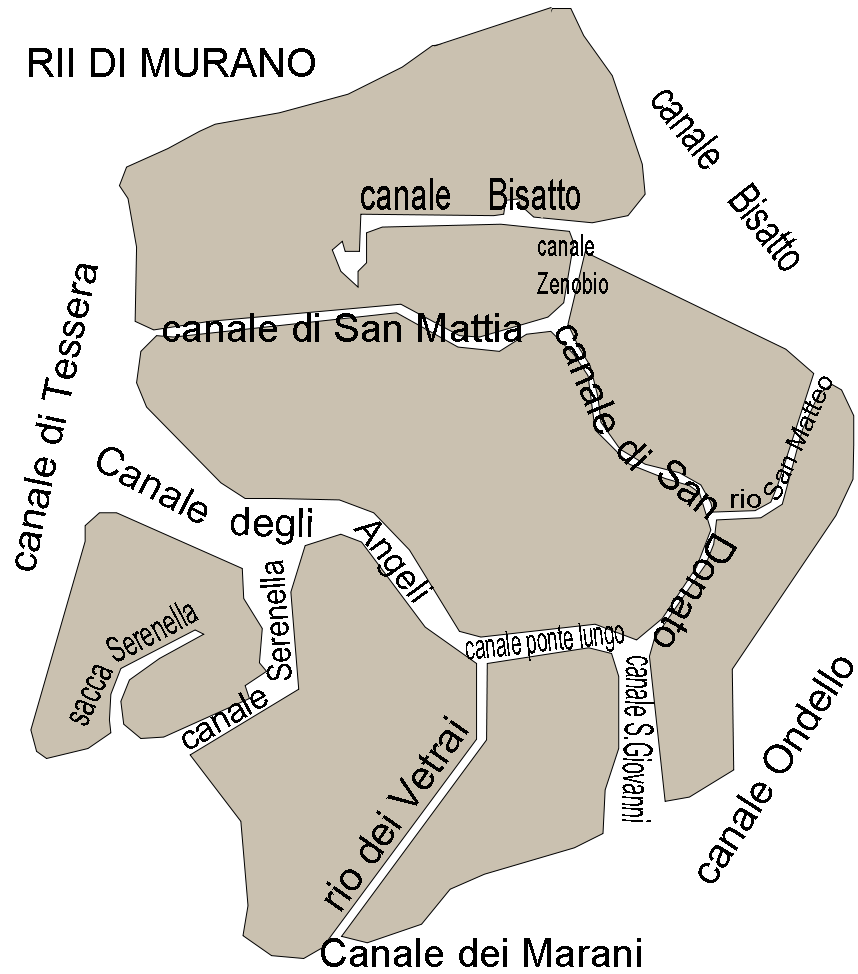
The eight channels separating the islands of Murano

== Economy ==
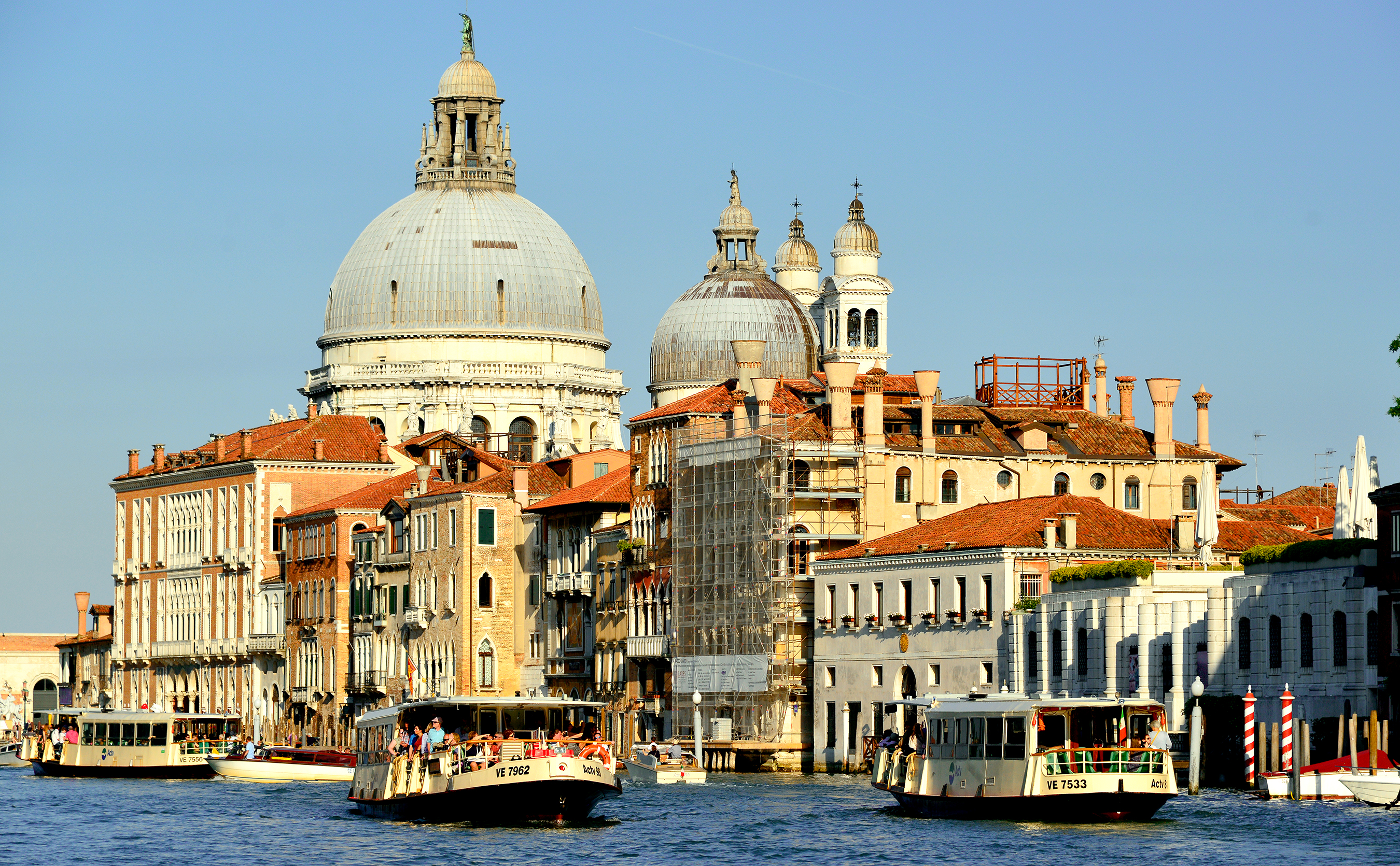
Numerous tourists take a vaporetto from Venice to visit Murano.

Weakness in the economy has affected Murano but some 260 companies remain in operation, employing 1,100 staff members (2016 data) and the island receives numerous tourists.

== See also ==
- List of islands of Italy
- Murano Lighthouse
- Murano Beads
- Murano glass
- Venetian glass
- Stazione Sperimentale del Vetro (Experimental Station for Glass)
- Muranów
- Nissan Murano

== Notes ==
On 8 July 1797 was published the first comprehensive history book "Notizie Istorico-geografiche Murano", 1797. about the history of Murano.
