= Stazione Sperimentale per le Industrie degli Oli e dei Grassi =

Italian research institute

45°28′29.6″N 9°13′35.3″E

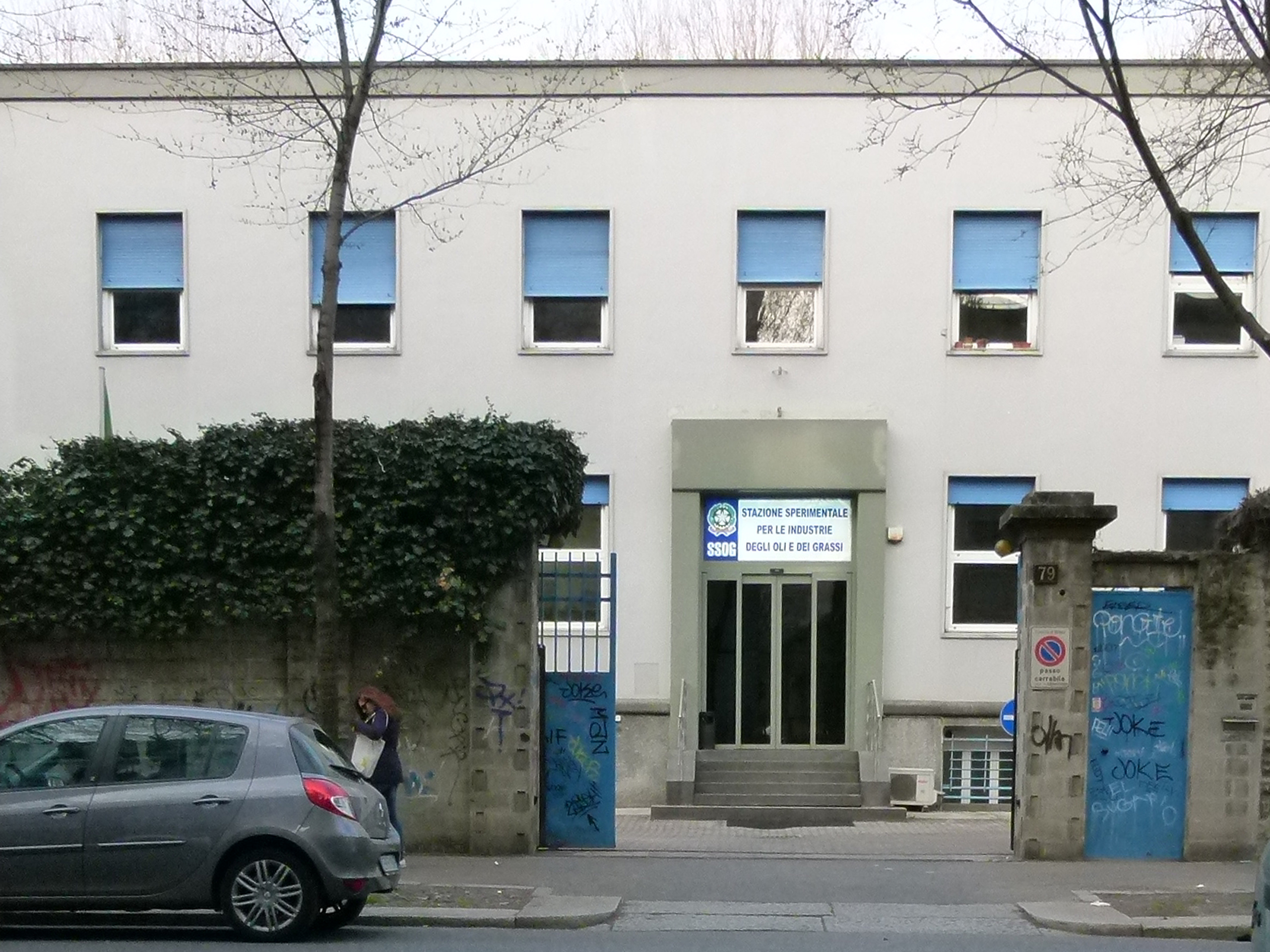
Oils and Fats Experimental Station

The Stazione Sperimentale per le Industrie degli Oli e dei Grassi (SSOG) (Oils and Fats Experimental Station) is a special Agency of the Chamber of Commerce in Milan. It is an Institute for applied research, established in Milan in 1904, and operating on a national scale with the specific aim of promoting the technical and technological progress in the oils, fats and derived products industry. In 1999 SSOG was transformed into a public economic institution with important legal, operational and administrative modifications which, however, have left its mission and functions unchanged.

== See also ==
- Stazione Sperimentale per i Combustibili
- Stazione Sperimentale per la Seta
- Stazione Sperimentale Carta, Cartoni e Paste per Carta
- Stazione Sperimentale per l'Industria delle Pelli e delle Materie Concianti
