= Stazione Sperimentale per la Seta =

Special Agency of the Chamber of Commerce in Milan, Italy, established in 1923

The Stazione Sperimentale per la Seta (SSS) (Silk Experimental Station) is a special Agency of the Chamber of Commerce in Milan. It is an Institute for applied research, established in Milan in 1923, and operating on a national scale with the specific aim of promoting the technical and technological progress in the silk and derived products industry. In 1999 SSS was transformed into a public economic institution with important legal, operational and administrative modifications which, however, have left its mission and functions unchanged.

== See also ==
- Stazione Sperimentale per i Combustibili
- Stazione Sperimentale per le Industrie degli Oli e dei Grassi
- Stazione Sperimentale Carta, Cartoni e Paste per Carta
- Stazione Sperimentale per l'Industria delle Pelli e delle Materie Concianti
