= Stazione Sperimentale per i Combustibili =

Research institute in Milan, Italy

The Stazione Sperimentale per i Combustibili (SSC) (Fuel Experimental Station) is a special Agency of the Chamber of Commerce in Milan. It is an Institute for applied research, established in Milan in 1940 replacing the Politecnico di Milano Fuel Section, and operating on a national scale with the specific aim of promoting the technical and technological progress in the fossil fuels and derived products industry. In 1999 SSC was transformed into a public economic institution with important legal, operational and administrative modifications which, however, have left its mission and functions unchanged.

== See also ==
- Stazione Sperimentale per le Industrie degli Oli e dei Grassi
- Stazione Sperimentale per la Seta
- Stazione Sperimentale Carta, Cartoni e Paste per Carta
