= Barbarigo =

Barbarigo may refer to:

== People with the surname ==
- Barbarigo family, a noble family of the Republic of Venice
- Angelo Barbarigo (1350-1418), Italian Roman Catholic Cardinal
- Marco Barbarigo di Croia (fl. 1388–d. 1428), Venetian nobleman, ruler of Croia (Krujë) by marriage to Helena Thopia
- Marco Barbarigo (1413-1486), Doge of Venice from 1485 to 1486
- Master of the Barbarigo Reliefs, Italian sculptor active around Venice between about 1486 and about 1515
- Agostino Barbarigo (1420-1501), Doge of Venice from 1486 to 1501, brother of Marco Barbarigo
- Pietro Francesco Barbarigo (d 1499) Founding investor in the Aldine Press (nephew of Agostino)
- Jacomo Barbarigo (15th century), Venetian commentator and also the provveditore of Morea
- Agostino Barbarigo (1516–1571), Venetian nobleman, commander of the Christian left wing, during the Battle of Lepanto
- Jacopo Barbarigo (or Jacopo de' Barbari; 15-16th century), Italian painter and printmaker
- Marcantonio Barbarigo, Venerable (1640–1706), Italian cardinal, founder of the Institute of the Religious Teachers Filippini
- Saint Gregory Barbarigo (1625-1697), Cardinal of Padua
- Giovanni Francesco Barbarigo (1658–1730), Italian cardinal, nephew of Saint Gregorio Barbarigo
- Caterina Sagredo Barbarigo (fl. 1747), a Venetian aristocrat and salon holder
- Contarina Barbarigo (died 1804), Venetian noble

== Buildings ==
- Palazzo Barbarigo, a palace situated facing the Grand Canal of Venice, Italy
- Palazzo Barbarigo Minotto, a 15th-century palace on the Grand Canal in Venice
- Palazzo Barbarigo della Terrazza, a Baroque-style palace on the Grand Canal, Venice
- Villa Barbarigo, Noventa Vicentina, a patrician villa in the comune of Noventa Vicentina, Vicenza, northern Italy
- Villa Barbarigo (Valsanzibio), or Villa Barbarigo Pizzoni Ardemani, a 17th-century rural villa, south of Padua, Italy

== Other uses ==
- Italian submarine Agostino Barbarigo, launched in 1918
- Italian submarine Barbarigo, launched 1938; sunk 1943
