= 1486 =

1486 in various calendars
- Gregorian calendar: 1486; MCDLXXXVI
- Ab urbe condita: 2239
- Armenian calendar: 935; ԹՎ ՋԼԵ
- Assyrian calendar: 6236
- Balinese saka calendar: 1407–1408
- Bengali calendar: 892–893
- Berber calendar: 2436
- English Regnal year: 1 Hen. 7 – 2 Hen. 7
- Buddhist calendar: 2030
- Burmese calendar: 848
- Byzantine calendar: 6994–6995
- Chinese calendar: 乙巳年 (Wood Snake); 4183 or 3976 — to — 丙午年 (Fire Horse); 4184 or 3977
- Coptic calendar: 1202–1203
- Discordian calendar: 2652
- Ethiopian calendar: 1478–1479
- Hebrew calendar: 5246–5247
- Hindu calendars
- Vikram Samvat: 1542–1543
- Shaka Samvat: 1407–1408
- Kali Yuga: 4586–4587
- Holocene calendar: 11486
- Igbo calendar: 486–487
- Iranian calendar: 864–865
- Islamic calendar: 890–891
- Japanese calendar: Bunmei 18 (文明１８年)
- Javanese calendar: 1402–1403
- Julian calendar: 1486; MCDLXXXVI
- Korean calendar: 3819
- Minguo calendar: 426 before ROC 民前426年
- Nanakshahi calendar: 18
- Thai solar calendar: 2028–2029
- Tibetan calendar: ཤིང་མོ་སྦྲུལ་ལོ་ (female Wood-Snake); 1612 or 1231 or 459 — to — མེ་ཕོ་རྟ་ལོ་ (male Fire-Horse); 1613 or 1232 or 460

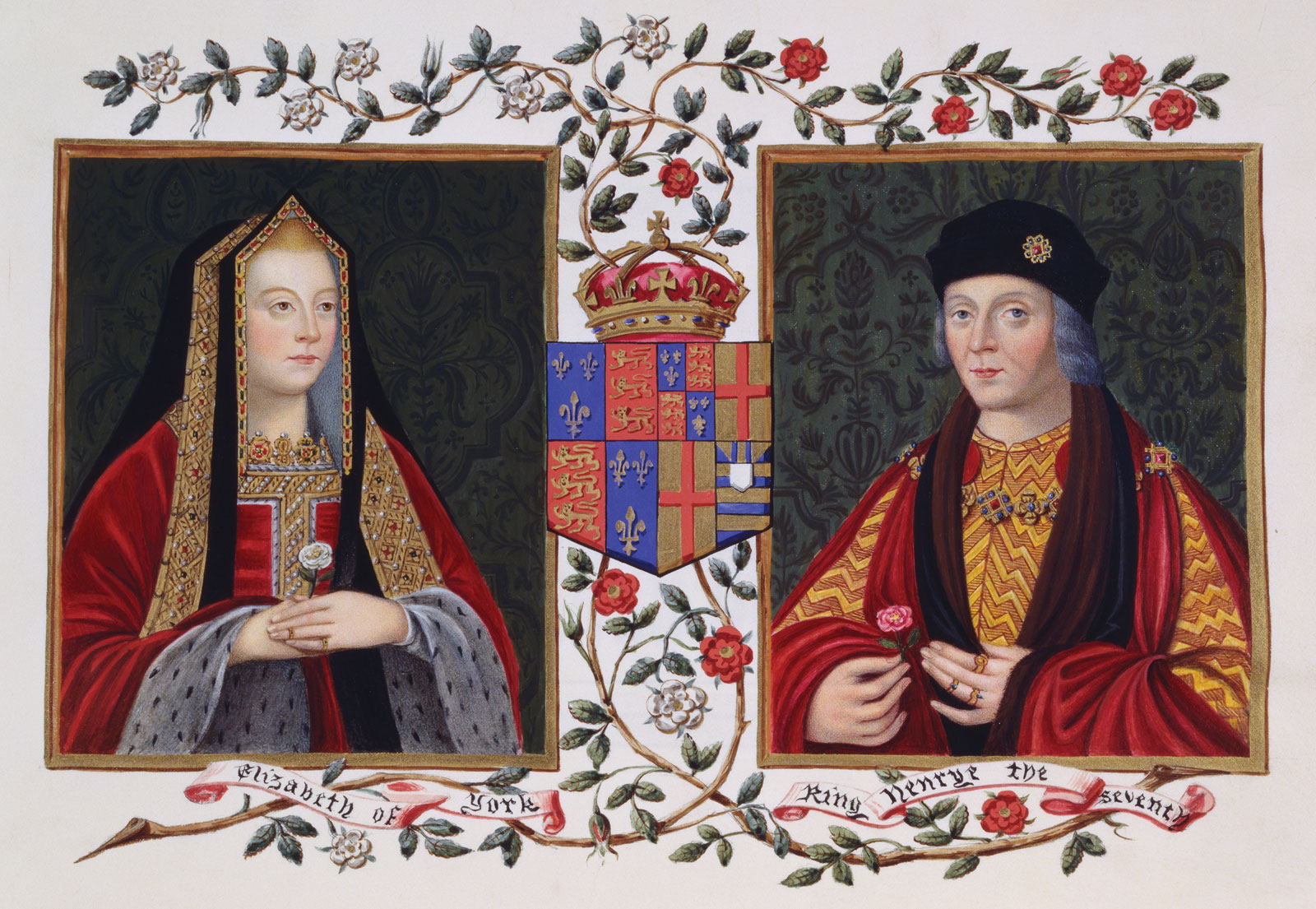
January 18: The marriage of King Henry VII of the House of Lancaster and Elizabeth of York brings an official end to the Wars of the Roses.

Year 1486 (MCDLXXXVI) was a common year starting on Sunday.

== Events ==
=== January–March ===
- January 13 – In Austria, the siege of Wiener Neustadt by the Kingdom of Hungary begins and will last for more than a year and a half before the city is surrendered to Hungary and is renamed Biencújhely. As part of the terms of peace, Austria cedes much of the territory of Lower Austria to the Hungarian King Matthias Corvinus.
- January 18 – King Henry VII of England and Elizabeth of York are married, uniting the House of Lancaster and the House of York, and ceremonially ending the Wars of the Roses.
- February 16 – Archduke Maximilian I of Habsburg is elected King of the Romans at Frankfurt.
- February 18 –
  - Lord Chaitanya Mahaprabhu is born in the town of Nadia, West Bengal, India, just after sunset. He is regarded as an incarnation, or avatar, of Lord Krsna, and later comes to inaugurate the sankirtana movement, or the chanting of the Holy Names of the Lord. This chanting, or mantra meditation, is first brought to the United States in 1965, by A.C. Bhaktivedanta Swami Prabhupada.
  - At a meeting of six electors of the Holy Roman Empire at Frankfurt-am-Main, the Archduke Maximilian of Austria, is elected as the King of the Romans and ruler of the Germans, as the son of Frederick III, Holy Roman Emperor.
- March 1 – King James III of Scotland gives royal assent to acts passed by the Scottish Parliament, including the Tallow Act, the Hides Act and the Currency Act.
- March 4 – The first English Parliament of King Henry VII is dissolved after more than four months.
- March 6 – John Morton is appointed by King Henry VII as the Lord Chancellor of England and chief justice of the Court of Chancery.
- March 10 – The government of the Free Imperial City of Köln (Cologne), now part of Germany, begins the removal of all prostitutes from the city.
- March 11 – In Berlin, Johann von Hohenzollern becomes the new Elector of Brandenburg, the independent Electorate within the Holy Roman Empire, upon the death of his father, the Elector Albrecht III Achilles.
- March 23 – After getting into a war with the Kingdom of Naples by siding with rebels in the Barons' Conspiracy, Pope Innocent VIII sends the Papal Legate, Cardinal Giuliano della Rovere (who will become later become Pope Julius II), as an envoy to the Kingdom of France to seek assistance from King Charles VIII. King Charles sends a delegation to Rome two months later, with no resolution made.

=== April–June ===
- April 9 – The coronation of Maximilian the First as "King of the Romans" takes place at Aachen, in that the Holy Roman Imperial capital of Vienna was captured by Hungary.
- April 21 – The adoption of the Sentència Arbitral de Guadalupe ends the War of the Remences, in the Principality of Catalonia.
- April 23 – The Stafford and Lovell rebellion is started against King Henry VII of England by three House of York supporters, Sir Humphrey Stafford, Thomas Stafford and Francis Lovell, 1st Viscount Lovell, who had hoped to restore the Yorkist monarchy led by the late King Richard III.
- May 1 – After being rejected twice by Portugal's King Joao II, Italian-born explorer Christopher Columbus (Cristoforo Colombo) is granted an audience by Queen Isabella I of Castile and presents to her his proposal to sail westward to find an alternate route to Asia. The Queen refers the matter to a committee of experts, who conclude (as the Portuguese advisers did in 1484) that Columbus has underestimated the distance to Asia. However, she and King Ferdinand of Aragon elect to keep Columbus from taking his plans elsewhere, and grant him an allowance of 14,000 maravedis per year, and an expense account for food and lodging while in Spain.
- May 13 – Humphrey Stafford and his brother Thomas Stafford, who had been given sanctuary by the church at Culham, Oxfordshire, are forcibly removed by Sir John Savage and 60 armed men on charges of treason. Protests are made to Pope Innocent VIII against the breaking of the right of sanctuary in the Roman Catholic Church, and while Thomas is pardoned by King Henry, Humphrey is executed for treason on July 8.
- May 31 – The French delegation from King Charles arrives in Rome to discuss the assistance request from Pope Innocent, but negotiations fail because of Cardinal Borgia's support of the Spanish King of Naples.
- June 7 – Pope Innocent VIII responds to complaints made in a letter to him from King Matthias Corvinus of Hungary and Austria, and declares that the Holy See does not resent Hungary for its war against the Holy Roman Empire, and promises to examine the Hungarian King's concerns.
- June 13 – King Henry VII of England issues a proclamation confirming that Pope Innocent VIII had issued a papal bull recognizing Henry's title as the rightful King. In the same proclamation, King Henry asserts that opposition to his title will be punishable by excommunication under the papal bull, and declares that the marriage to Elizabeth of York ended "the variances, dissensions and debates that had been in the realm of England between the houses of the Dukes of Lancaster on the one part and the house of the Duchy of York on the other." King Henry uses the new technology of the printing press as his means of mass communication throughout England, and hires printer Walter de Machlinea mass produce the declaration for distribution.

=== July–September ===
- July 12 – Pope Innocent VIII issues the papal bull Catholice fidei defensionem, granting plenary indulgences to people who took part in the war of Casimir IV Jagiellon against the Ottoman Empire.
- August 10 – The Papal States, led by Pope Innocent VIII, sign a treaty with King Ferrante of Naples to avoid an invasion.
- August 14 – Marco Barbarigo, Doge of the Republic of Venice, dies after only nine months in office, and his brother Agostino Barbarigo is elected to replace him.
- September 11 – The Conspiracy of the Barons, a revolt by the Neapolitan nobility, begins in the Kingdom of Naples with the rebels taking an oath at the Chiesa di Sant'Antonio Abate in Campania against the rule of King Ferrante, the Spanish prince made King of Naples after the kingdom's conquest by the Crown of Aragon.
- September 20 – An heir is born to Elizabeth of York and King Henry VII of England, being invested as Arthur, Prince of Wales in 1490. Unfortunately, Arthur will die from an illness at age 15, seven years before the death of King Henry.

=== October–December ===
- October 6 – Cardinal John Morton becomes the new Roman Catholic Archbishop of Canterbury, Primate of All England.
- October 10 –
  - King João II of Portugal appoints Bartolomeu Dias to lead an expedition to sail around what will be called the Cape of Good Hope, the southern tip of Africa, in the hope of finding a trade route to India.
  - The Siege of Retz in Austria comes to an end after four days when the inhabitants surrender to the Black Army of Hungary and King Matthias Corvinus.
- October 14 – At Srinagar (now in India), Fateh Shah Miri becomes the new Sultan of Kashmir after defeating the Sultan Muhammad Shah Mir.
- November 5 – At Enniskillen, capital of the Kingdom of Fermanagh in what is now County Fermanagh on the Republic of Ireland's border with Northern Ireland, King Éamonn mac Thomáis Óig abdicates and is succeeded briefly by his brother Thomáis Óg mac Thomáis Óig, who is deposed by Seánn mac Pilib meic Thomáis Mhóir before the end of the year.
- December 18 – The Conspiracy of the Barons comes to an end when the Aragon troops and King Ferrante recapture the city of Venosa.

=== Date unknown ===
- Tízoc, Aztec ruler of Tenochtitlan, dies. Some sources suggest that he was poisoned, others that he was the victim of "sorcery" or illness. He is succeeded by his brother Āhuitzotl.
- Sigismund, Archduke of Tyrol, issues Europe's first large silver coin, the guldengroschen, which will later become the thaler.
- Provence was legally incorporated into the French royal domain.
- Giovanni Pico della Mirandola returns to Florence, and writes Oration on the Dignity of Man.
- Johann Reuchlin begins studying the Hebrew language.
- The first written use of the word football is made to describe the ball itself.

== Births ==
- January 6 – Martin Agricola, German Renaissance composer and music theorist (d. 1556)
- February 10 – George of the Palatinate, German nobleman; Bishop of Speyer (1513–1529) (d. 1529)
- February 18 – Chaitanya Mahaprabhu, Bengali ascetic and monk (d. 1534)
- July 2 – Jacopo Sansovino, Italian sculptor and architect (d. 1570)
- July 16 – Andrea del Sarto, Italian painter (d. 1530)
- July 25 – Albrecht VII of Mecklenburg (1503–1520), Duke of Mecklenburg-Güstrow (1520–1547) (d. 1547)
- July 28 – Pieter Gillis, French philosopher (d. 1533)
- August 3 – Imperia Cognati, Italian courtesan (d. 1512)
- August 23 – Sigismund von Herberstein, Austrian diplomat and historian (d. 1566)
- September 14 – Heinrich Cornelius Agrippa, German astrologer and alchemist (d. 1535)
- September 20 – Arthur, Prince of Wales, son of Henry VII of England (d. 1502)
- October 10 – Duke Charles III of Savoy (d. 1553)
- November 13 – Johann Eck, German Scholastic theologian and defender of Catholicism during the Protestant Reformation (d. 1543)
- December 9 – Count Philip III of Waldeck-Eisenberg (1524–1539) (d. 1539)
- date unknown – Shimon Lavi, Sephardi kabbalist (d. 1585)
- probable
  - Colin Campbell, 3rd Earl of Argyll (d. 1535)
  - Gerolamo Emiliani, Venetian-born humanitarian, canonized (d. 1537)
  - Ludwig Senfl, Swiss composer (d. 1542 or 1543)

== Deaths ==
- January 30 – Jacques of Savoy, Count of Romont, Prince of Savoy (b. 1450)
- March 11 – Albrecht III Achilles, Elector of Brandenburg (b. 1414)
- March 30 – Thomas Bourchier, Archbishop of Canterbury and Lord Chancellor of England (b. c. 1404)
- May – Louis I, Count of Montpensier (b. 1405)
- July 14 – Margaret of Denmark, Scottish queen consort, daughter of Christian I of Denmark (b. 1456)
- August (day unknown) – Marco Barbarigo, the 73rd Doge of Venice, was said to have died in a dispute caused by his brother and successor, Agostino Barbarigo.
- August 3 – Asakura Ujikage, 8th head of the Japanese Asakura clan (b. 1449)
- August 11 – William Waynflete, English Lord Chancellor and bishop of Winchester (b. c. 1398)
- August 26 – Ernest, Elector of Saxony, progenitor of the Ernestine Wettins (b. 1441)
- September 2 – Guy XIV de Laval, French noble (b. 1406)
- September 19 – Richard Oldham, English Catholic bishop
- date unknown
  - Tízoc, Aztec ruler of Tenochtitlan (perhaps poisoned)
  - Souvanna Banlang, Lan Xang king (b. 1455)
- probable – Aristotile Fioravanti, Italian architect and engineer (b. 1415)
