= Ca Bembo =

16th-century palazzo in Venice, Italy

Coordinates: 45.43°N 12.33°E

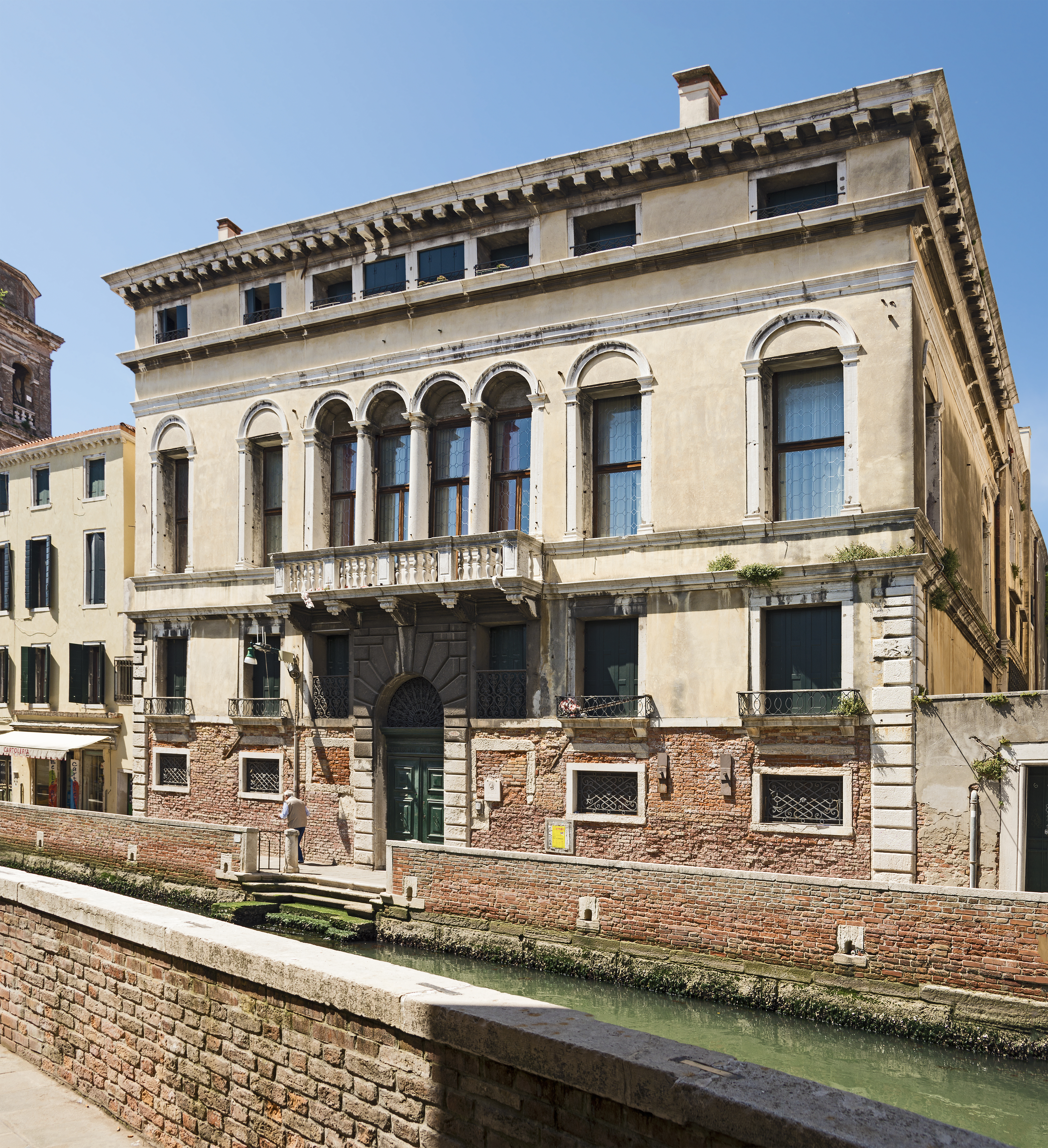
The facade of Ca Bembo overlooking the Rio di San Trovaso

Ca Bembo is a grade-listed sixteenth-century palazzo in the parish of San Trovaso in the sestiere of Dorsoduro in Venice, Italy, noteworthy for a particularly large garden. It has, despite its name, no clear connection with the Bembo family, but a particularly strong association with one of the most prominent branches of the aristocratic Venetian family of the Barbarigo.

== Origins ==
The area which now houses the palazzo was originally occupied by the main residence of the Osso duro- which is to say the Dorsoduro branch of the Barbarigo family, whose main property is first mentioned as lining the canal of San Trovaso in a property title deed dating from 1374. This branch was also known as the "Barbarigo de San Trovaso" branch.

The Dorsoduro branch of the Barbarigo family went on to achieve particular prominence in the fifteenth century, its most eminent representative, Francesco "il Ricco", fathering Doge Marco Barbarigo (1413-1486) and Doge Agostino Barbarigo (1419-1501) as well as Dogaressa Elena Barbarigo, wife of Doge Niccolò Marcello. His firstborn son, who did not obtain the ducal title, Girolamo Barbarigo, was nevertheless a crucial player in the Republic's politics: an ambassador and procurator of Saint Mark, he distinguished himself by leading the aristocratic faction that masterminded the deposition of Doge Francesco Foscari and his replacement with Pasquale Malipiero.

The properties around the present site of Ca Bembo were divided between the Barbarigo brothers in 1464, with the site of present-day Ca Bembo passing to first-born son Girolamo. Little survives of the Gothic structure of the fifteenth-century Palazzo that Girolamo inherited at the partition of family property, except for an Istrian stone wellhead, sculpted with the arms of the Barbarigo family and attributed to the workshop of Antonio Rizzo, now in the gardens behind Ca' Bembo.

The Gothic palazzo that had devolved to Girolamo was object of another partition amongst heirs in 1518 before becoming the object of a vast programme of artistic and architectural renovation during the sixteenth century undertaken under the guidance of Agostino Barbarigo, Girolamo's grandson.

== Renovations under Jacopo Sansovino ==
Agostino, not to be confused with the homonymous doge that preceded him a century earlier, had been first a magistrate, serving first as Savio agli Ordini and later as Savio di Terraferma before being appointed, for the period between 1554 and 1557, Venetian ambassador to France and later extraordinary ambassador, together with Andrea Biagio Badoer, to Philip II of Spain in 1560-1561, and lieutenant governor of Friuli in 1562-63. At the peak of his career, Barbarigo was to become commander of the left-flank galleys of the Venetian fleet at the Battle of Lepanto, where he found his death as a result of the engagement, killed by a fatal arrow-wound in an eye. As the most senior Christian commander to die in the engagement of Lepanto, he became the object of particular memorialisation.

But as a rising aristocrat, he had sought to mark his political ascent with an ambitious programme of reconstruction. As such, in the 1550s, he oversaw the reconstruction of the palace- Ca Bembo- in the new monumental Renaissance style, of Florentine and Roman inspiration, that Jacopo Sansovino was overseeing in Venice, and particularly noticeable in the Fabbriche Nuove di Rialto, and he entrusted the project to none other than Sansovino himself, as recorded by Andrea Sansovino's son Francesco's memoirs on architecture and identifiable in the palazzo's imposing portal.

However doubts have been expressed as to whether all of the palazzo's facade was Sansovino's work: the piano nobile's exterior is characterised by an eclectic use of compositive elements, that mixes doric and corinthian capitals in defiance of the austere taste of Sansovino, and as such it is supposed that other architects worked on the building.

== Ovidian fresco cycle by Tintoretto ==
Equally imposing was a cycle of frescoes that decorated the facade, and that Agostino Barbarigo had commissioned to Iacopo Tintoretto to top the reconstruction of the palazzo. The frescoes have unfortunately been lost due to the erosion of salty winds and humidity. By the eighteenth century only two of four were clearly visible, and in photographs from 1929 only cracked and badly damaged remains of these were visible. In their time they were however very noteworthy, seventeenth-century art critic Carlo Ridolfi noting in his Maraviglie dell'arte, at a time when the palazzo had passed out of the hands of the Barbarigos to the Marcello, that "amongst the works of fresco the first applause goes to the painted facade of Casa Marcello in San Gervaso, that is to say San Trovaso, where Tintoretto painted for fables of Ovid".

== Later history and controversial swap ==
In 1618 the last male heir of Agostino Barbarigo, his son Pietro, died childless in Corfù, and the palace passed to various families- the Marcello first- before becoming possession of the Sangiantoffetti family, wealthy merchants from Crema that had received the noble title thanks to generous disbursements during the Cretan war. The Sangiantoffetti oversaw the redecoration of the palace interiors with allegorical frescos that are the work of Venetian painter Costantino Cedini and that survive to this day.

It is currently occupied by the faculty of languages of Ca 'Foscari University of Venice.

In November 2013 the chancellor Carlo Carraro announced plans for the alienation of the palazzo. Ca' Bembo, together with Ca' Cappello and Palazzo Cosulich, was to be swapped for an office block in order to facilitate the unification of two departments of languages. The operation has been particularly controversial, as Italian investigative weekly l'Espresso noted the absence of a public auction and the possibility of its violation of Italian law on listed heritage property. As a result of such problems, four MPs led by Davide Zoggia have requested a parliamentary enquiry into the matter. The Chancellor has repeatedly defended the formal correctness of the operation, and has pointed out that it is necessary to safeguard future budgets.

Further controversy has ensued over suspected dioxin poisoning in the garden grounds, with parents of a local elementary school that uses the garden expressing particular concern.
