= Villa Barbarigo =

Villa Barbarigo may refer to several villas in Italy associated with the Barbarigo family:

- Villa Barbarigo, Noventa Vicentina
- Villa Barbarigo (Valsanzibio)
