= Treaty of Blois =

The Treaty of Blois may refer to:

- Treaty of Blois (1499), an alliance between France and Venice against the Duchy of Milan.
- Treaty of Blois (1504) (September 22), Louis XII of France and Maximilian I, King of the Romans agree that the dowry of Louis XII's daughter, Claude, in marriage to Maximilian's grandson, the future emperor Charles V, would include Milan and Burgundy. In return, Maximilian agrees to recognize Louis XII as the duke of Milan. The union never happens.
- Treaty of Blois (1505) (October 12), Louis XII of France renounces his claim to Naples, leaving the kingdom in control of Ferdinand of Aragon.
- Treaty of Blois (1509) (December 12), an alliance between Ferdinand II of Aragon (and now regent of Castile), Holy Roman Emperor Maximilian I, and King Louis XII of France in the War of the League of Cambrai in northern Italy.
- Treaty of Blois (1512) (July 18), a defensive pact between Navarre and France to respect Navarre's neutrality, whereby Francis I of France also recognizes the sovereignty of the Principality of Béarn.
- Treaty of Blois (1513) (March 23), an alliance between France and Venice against the Duchy of Milan.
- Treaty of Blois (1572), an agreement to have free trade and a military alliance between England and France against Spain in the Spanish Netherlands.

== Sources ==
- Augustyn, Adam (2024). "Louis XII". Encyclopaedia Britannica.
- Campbell, Gordon (2005). "The Oxford Dictionary of Renaissance". Oxford Reference. Oxford University Press.
