= Palazzo Grimani =

Palazzo Grimani may refer to:

- Palazzo Grimani Marcello, Venice, Italy
- Palazzo Grimani di San Luca, Venice, Italy
- Palazzo Grimani di Santa Maria Formosa, Venice, Italy
