= Pietro Francesco Barbarigo =

15th century Venetian nobleman and financier

Pietro Francesco Barbarigo (also known as Piero, fl. 1496 – c. 1499) was a Venetian nobleman, public official and one of the three founding investors in the Aldine Press. Barbarigo's role in the enterprise was documented at the time as "exclusively financial".

== Investor in the Aldine Press ==
Barbarigo was the owner of paper mills and father of the printer Aldus Manutius' student Santo. After the initial investment in equipment and type, paper was the highest cost in book production. As a printer would need to raise capital on the security of future sales, many paper manufacturers became established capitalists. Pietro had an "an entrepreneurial mindset that considered the challenges and risks which came with enterprise."

In 1495 Barbarigo went into partnership with Andrea Torresano to finance a new printing enterprise. Barbarigo provided capital, Torresani oversaw the printing operations, and Aldus Manutius worked on text acquisition, text preparation, and marketing. The Barbarigo were a powerful Venetian family (Pietro's uncle Agostino Barabrigo was doge at the time) and with hi family connections he could open many doors for the new business.

The ownership of the Aldine Press was originally split in two, with one half belonging to Barbarigo and the other half belonging to Andrea Torresano. Aldus Manutius later owned one fifth of Torresano's share of the press.

== Public Life ==
In 1496 he was recorded as the provveditore (overseer and auditor) of the Camera degli Imprestiti (the Venetian Republic's Public Debt Office). This office managed the prestiti, which were loans forced on wealthy families. In this role he is known to have participated in an audit of one of the Republic's largest capital funds, the Monte Vecchio.
