= Palazzo Cappello Layard =

Palace in Venice, Italy

Coordinates: 45.4362°N 12.3301°E

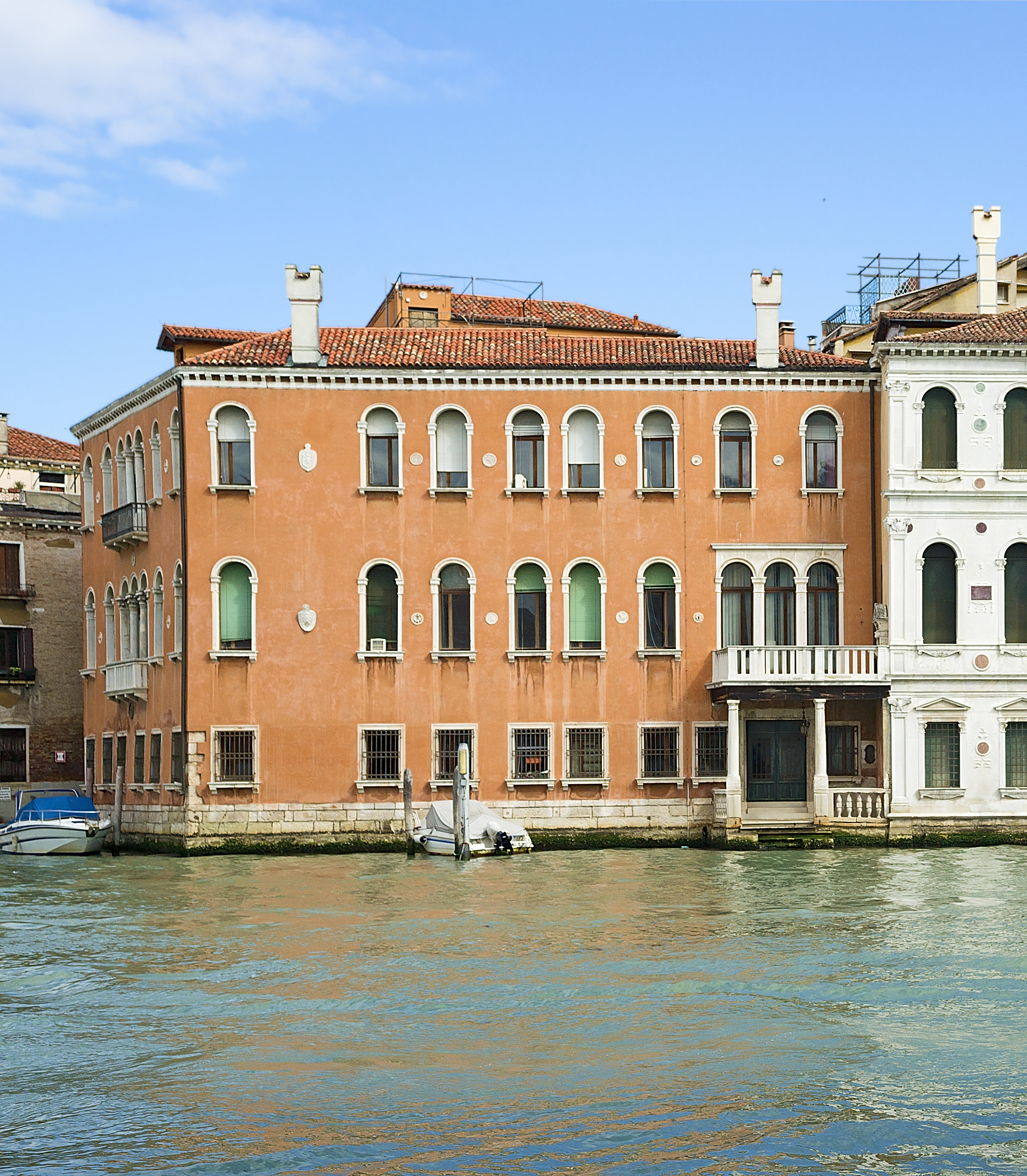
Ca' Cappello-Layard - Facade on Grand Canal

The Palazzo or Ca' Cappello Layard is a palace situated in the sestiere of San Polo of Venice, Italy, overlooking the Grand Canal at the confluence between this and the smaller Rio di San Polo and Rio delle Erbe. On the Grand canal, it is located between Palazzo Barbarigo della Terrazza and Palazzo Grimani Marcello. It is particularly noteworthy for having been the residence of Austen Henry Layard, discoverer of Nineveh.

== Description ==
Located on the confluence of three canals, it is thus an unusual structure in that it presents three facades rather than the customary one.

- Façade on the Grand Canal. It is the widest of the facades, it is characterized by a sober aspect and a large number of lancet windows. The first piano nobile is enriched by a large rectangular three-mullioned window that opens onto a terrace next to Palazzo Grimani Marcello
- Façade on the Rio delle Erbe. The least impressive of the facades
- Façade on the Rio di San Polo. It is enriched by two balconied three-mullioned windows, with elaborate capitels, flanked by an elegant couple of lancet windows. Nineteenth-century stone-carved patera of romanesque taste enrich the façade.

== Origins and lost fresco cycle by Veronese and Zelotti ==
Ca' Cappello is a grand palace of Gothic origin, but substantially restructured during the course of the sixteenth century under the direction of its owner, the procurator of Saint Mark Antonio Cappello, who had supervised some of the most important projects of construction and renovation in sixteenth-century Venice, in particular the commencement of work on Rialto bridge, the edification of the Biblioteca Nazionale Marciana and the supervision of the construction of the Golden staircase at Ducal Palace or the redecoration of the room of the Council of Ten within the palace.

For these important works Antonio had frequently commissioned painters Paolo Veronese and Giovanni Battista Zelotti, to who he had ties through common friend Michele Sanmicheli. Veronese and Zelotti were thus commissioned to decorate with frescoes the renovated Renaissance palace. The fresco cycle was noted by Giorgio Vasari as one of Veronese’s notable works “who painted with the same [Zelotti] the façade of the palace of M. Antonio Cappello that is in Venice overlooking the Grand Canal”. The frescoes were more extensively described by erudite Carlo Ridolfi in his 1648 Le Meraviglie dell’arte, “over the Grand Canal in the house of the Cappelli Veronese coloured some figures of Cerere, Pomona, Pallas and other deities. The figures above were painted by his friend Zelotti”. The cycle did not survive long. In his 1674 Miniere della Pittura Veneziana the erudite Marco Boschini noted surviving but damaged work by Zelotti, and wrote that much had already been lost in a fire. The deities painted by Zelotti were however still visible in 1760 when Anton Maria Zanetti printed his Varie Pitture a Fresco de principali maestri Veneziani, and reproduced in engravings the four surviving figures. It is not certain when these remaining and worn out frescoes were finally lost, but by the nineteenth century they were certainly no longer visible.

== Ca Cappello and the salon of the Layards ==
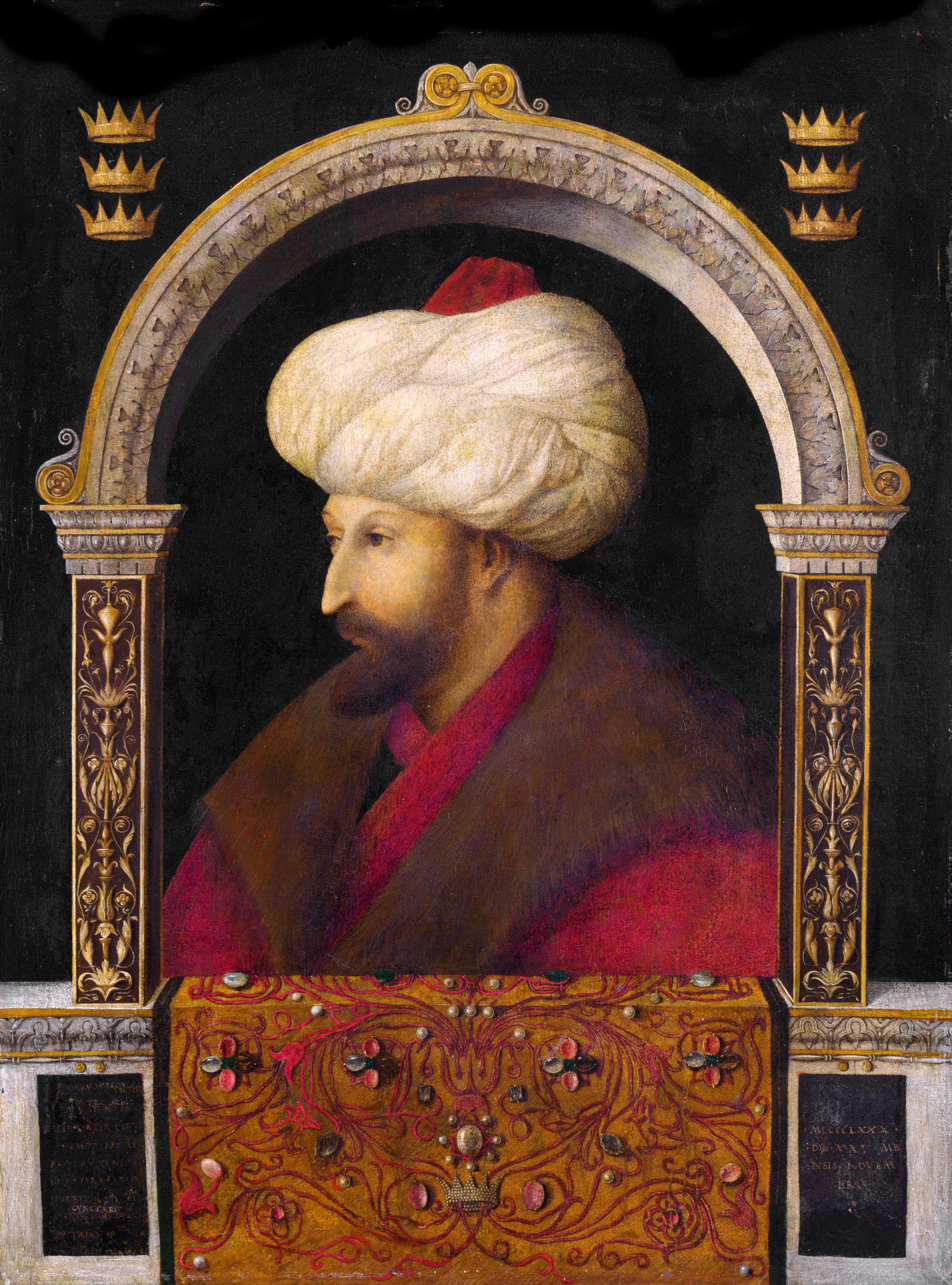
Portrait of Mehmet II by Gentile Bellini, c. 1481, 69.9x52.1 cm, National Gallery, London, originally in the Layard Gallery in Ca Cappello

Ca Cappello was purchased, at a date given variously as 1874 and 1878 by sources, by the English archeologist, diplomat and politician Austen Henry Layard, with the help of the doyen of the British community in Venice, the historian Rawdon Brown. Layard, who had shipped his great collection of Italian Renaissance paintings to Venice in 1875, inhabited the palazzo stably following his withdrawal from the diplomatic career after political debacle in Istanbul and deep disagreement with Gladstone until his death by cancer, on the occasion of a rare visit to London, in 1894. The frescoes by Zelotti and Veronese were no longer visible, but Layard managed significant renovation works in the palace. Red, yellow and green felt covered the walls inside, and Spanish silks festooned outside of balconies and windows gave the palazzo an unmistakable appearance. Assyrian reliefs from Nineveh and a Hellenistic funerary piece from Samos were installed into the staircase wall, though these were in 1892 donated to the Museo Civico Correr, and replaced with floral paintings by Neapolitan artist Francesco Lavagna.

More significant was the collection of paintings assembled by the Layards in a gallery in the palazzo, with the most significant work being the Portrait of Mehmet II by Gentile Bellini. Because of Layard’s particular standing, the palazzo quickly became a meeting place for “the greatest representatives of British and international cultural, political and diplomatic intelligentsia between the final quarter of the 19th century and the first decade of the XXth”. The Layards quickly rose amongst a thriving expat community in Venice, their patronage ensuring the edification of St. George’s Anglican church in Venice, where glass windows commemorate the founder. The death of Austen Henry Layard did not interrupt social activity, and his widow, Lady Enid, maintained an equally intense social activity in the palazzo. The intense social activity around the salon of Austen Henry Layard and his wife Enid is recorded in Lady Layard’s diary. Frequent visitors included art historians John Ruskin and Giovanni Morelli, the Victorian poet Robert Browning, of whose poetic abilities Lady Layard had a low opinion, and the historian Horatio Brown, as well as local nobles such as countess Annina Morosini, supposedly the most beautiful woman in Venice at the time, but whom Lady Layard found “vulgar”. Royalty acknowledged the Layards, and Lady Layard in particular enjoyed a special relationship with queen Alexandra and the German empress consort Victoria. Writing about Lady Layard in 1898 her friend Lady Gregory remembered that “the emperor [the Kaiser, son of empress Victoria] passed this house [Ca Cappello] recognized Lady Layard on the balcony and touched his hat two or three times”. In 1911 the Kaiser Wilhelm II of Germany and Lord Kitchener even held private meetings in Ca Cappello.

== Later History and controversial swap ==
The death of Lady Layard in 1912 and the outbreak of the war saw an end to Ca Cappello’s role as a leading literary and social salon in Venice. It was later acquired by the Carnelutti family, before passing in 1967 into the possession of the University of Venice Ca’ Foscari.

It is currently the object of a controversial swap operation that would see it transferred, together with sixteenth-century palace Ca Bembo and the modern Palazzo Cosulich, two other university properties, to a property investment fund in exchange for a 1957 former state electricity company edifice. The swap has aroused considerable criticism and investigative weekly L'Espresso has noted the absence of a public auction and problems connected with an apparent violation - only supposed - with Italian heritage law, that forbids the swap of listed property. The chancellor Carlo Carraro has defended the operation on budget grounds, arguing it will help stave off large cuts to scholarships and research funding.
