= Antonio Cappello =

Venetian noble

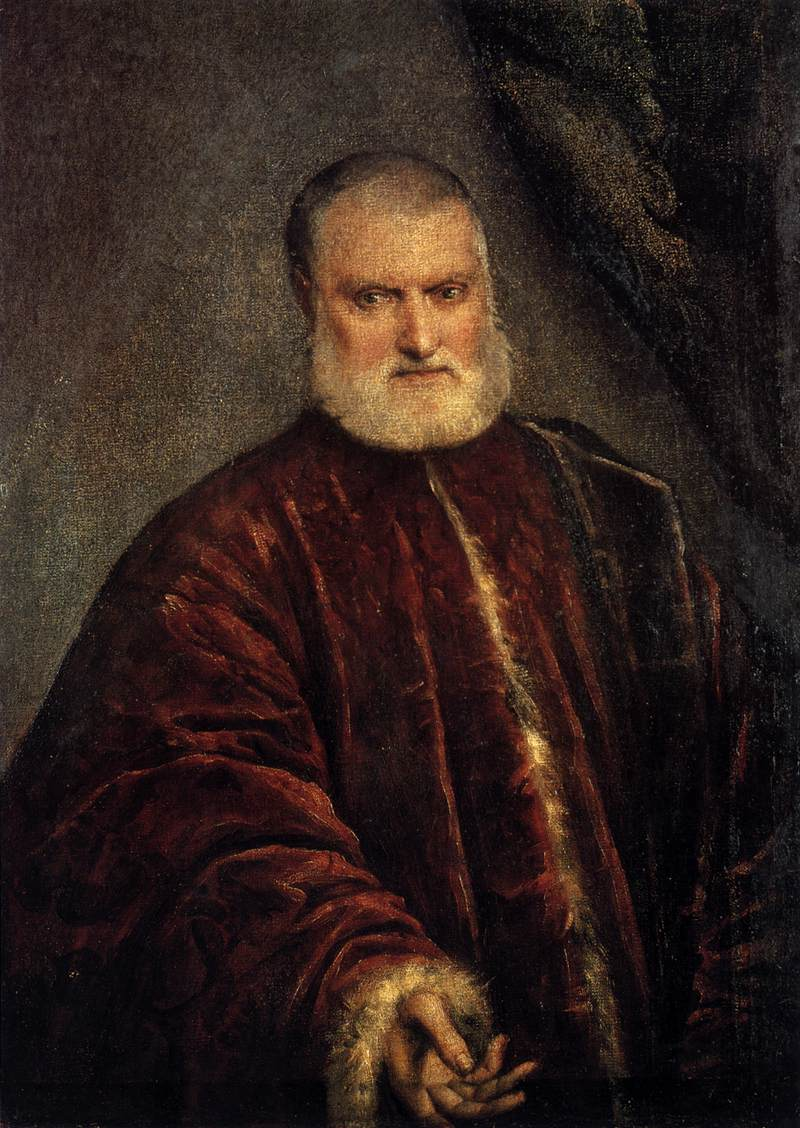
Portrait of the procurator Antonio Cappello, circa 1561, Jacopo Tintoretto, oil on canvas, 114 x 80 cm. Venice, Gallerie dell'Accademia.

Antonio Cappello (1494-1565) was a Venetian noble, a member of the San Polo branch of the Cappello family. A Procurator of St Mark's, he acted as ambassador to the court of Charles V at Gand, but is mainly remembered for his role as one of the main promoters of public art and architectural projects in sixteenth-century Venice. He resided in the palazzo on San Polo now known as Ca Cappello Layard and oversaw its redevelopment.

== Political beginnings ==
He was born approximately in 1494, the son of Giambattista of Marino Cappello, a merchant and a nobleman, and Paola Garzoni, daughter of Marino Garzoni, who had been prominent in politics as procuratore de Citra, podestà of Verona, podestà of Mantua and finally duke of Candia. Antonio Cappello began his political career at a young age. In 1511 he was vice-podestà of Cologna Veneta, in 1515 an official at the Dogana da Mar - the maritime customs office- and in 1516, with a donation to the Republic of 200 ducats, he secured the office of provveditore and captain in Legnago, in the Verona countryside. There he amassed considerable rural wealth, as tax returns for 1537 show him in agrarian possessions measuring up to 1,200 Venetian campi in area. In 1519 he joined the savi alle decime, then, through a 400 ducat donation he secured access to the pregadi before purchasing for 8,000 ducats the office of procuratore de Supra, one of the two chief procurators of Saint Mark's, tasked with the conservation and expansion of the Basilica. He would maintain the prestigious role for 42 years.

== Construction of the fortress of Legnago with Michele Sanmicheli ==
An important evolution in the career of Antonio Cappello was his nomination to provveditor sopra le fabbriche di Legnago- superintended over the fortification works of Legnago- in 1528, following the removal of the incompetent Pietro Tagliapietra. His task was to aid in the construction of the "fortezza nova" at Legnago, strongly desired by doge Andrea Gritti, a project under the direction of the commander-in-chief of the Venetian land forces Francesco Maria I della Rovere. The building of the fort however turned out to be a slow and contested process. On 15 December 1530 the chief architect working on the project, the Ferrarese Sigismondo de Fantis was fired for incompetency, to be replaced by his aide, the Veronese Michele Sanmicheli, whose Porta di San Martino had gained considerable acclaim as a tasteful yet function example of military engineering. Problems did not cease and in April 1532 the Republic's authorities, learning that the works were still far behind schedule removed Antonio Cappello from his role as superintendent. Both Michele Sanmichele and Francesco Maria della Rovere however defended his role and actions.

== Embassy at Charles V’s court at Gand ==
The removal from office at Legnago did not halt his career. In 1533 he was nominated savio alle acque, then procurator in the zonta dei nove- an additional group of councillors that sat with the Council of Ten- then in 1539, together with the duke of Urbino, inspector of the fortresses of the Venetian mainland, and then, on 27 December 1539, with Vincenzo Grimani, special ambassador to the courts of Francis I in France and emperor Charles V in Flanders, with the objective of convincing the two rival monarchs to set aside their differences and join Venice in an anti-Ottoman coalition. The embassy did not however obtain significant political results: Francis I valued his Ottoman allies, and so the Venetians made for Charles V's court, where they were well received and Antonio Cappello received the title of count imperial, but failed to secure meaningful military support. In the following years, Antonio Cappello was appointed to more prestigious public offices: he sat in the consiglio alle acque, then in the committee that superintended the fortifications of Zadar, then he was provveditor over the Republic's fortifications, In 1543 finally he was dispatched to negotiate the purchase of the fortress of Marano Lagunare in eastern Friuli, seized the previous year by a band of rogue Venetian subjects loyal to Florentine renegade adventurer Piero Strozzi from the Austrians, and which threatened to draw the Republic into the Italian War of 1542-46 then raging between Habsburgs and Valois. The affair was concluded with the hefty disbursement in favour of Piero Strozzi of 35,000 ducats, in exchange of which the Venetians gained the small but strategic town.

== Sponsorship of public art ==
The offices where he left the greatest mark were certainly those of artistic and architectural patronage. As procurator of Saint Mark's he was responsible of substantial restoration interventions in the Basilica of Saint Mark's, and also of the commencement of works on the Biblioteca Marciana. His experience in overseeing construction work saw him nominated as superintended over the bridge and works at Rialto together with Tommaso Contarini and Vettor Grimani for the period between January 1551 and November 1554, where he oversaw proposals for the redesigning of Rialto Bridge and the beginning of the works. He was renominated to the post with Gianbattista Grimani between October 1555 and October 1556 and continued to oversee the construction of the bridge. In the same year he was nominated superintended over works at the Ducal Palace, where he oversaw important works of reconstruction and redecoration, such as the repainting by Giovanni Battista Zelotti and Paolo Veronese of the ceiling of the room of the Council of Ten. He also led the council of fifteen patricians that oversaw the building of the Golden Staircase in the Ducal Palace.

This frontal role in the management of artistic and cultural policy in Venice put Antonio Cappello at the centre of an important artistic network. Significant in this sense was the friendship that tied him to architect Michele Sanmicheli from their shared days in Legnago, and this brought him to commission to Michele Sanmicheli important works. Not only that, but two of Sanmicheli's artistic protégés, Giovanni Battista Zelotti and Paolo Veronese, received from him important commissions.

== Commissioning of the fresco cycle of Zelotti and Veronese at Ca’ Cappello ==
It is not surprising that a man who promoted the Republic's political advancement through a cultivated cultural policy thought to advance his own personal political career through artistic patronage. As such Antonio Cappello organized a substantial reorganization of the Gothic palazzo he inherited on the Grand Canal, Ca’ Cappello, that culminated with Giovanni Battista Zelotti and Veronese creating a large fresco-cycle with mythological scenes. The frescoes were damaged by fire and had worn out by the nineteenth century, but in his 1648 Carlo Ridolfi could still see them "above the Grand Canal in the house of the Cappelli [Veronese] coloured some figures of Cerere, Pomona, Pallas and other deities, while those above were coloured by his friend Zelotti". Anton Maria Zanetti thought them very notable in the 1760 and had engravings made of the surviving figures.
