= Master of the Barbarigo Reliefs =

Italian sculptor

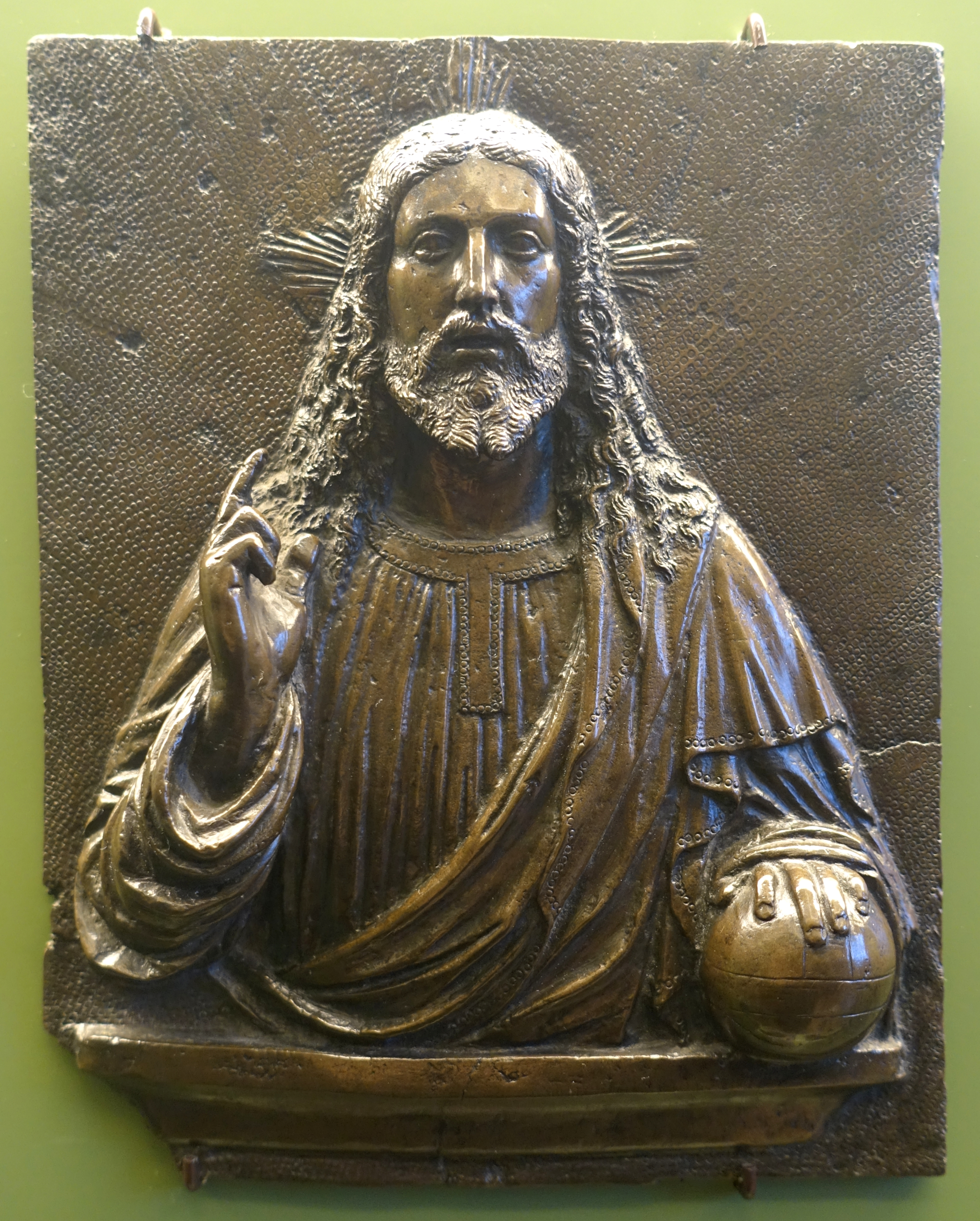
Christ as Salvator Mundi by the Master of the Barbarigo Reliefs, early 1500s

The Master of the Barbarigo Reliefs was an Italian sculptor active around Venice between about 1486 and about 1515. His name is derived from a set of reliefs in bronze, depicting the Coronation and Assumption of the Virgin and the twelve Apostles. These may be seen today in the Ca' d'Oro in Venice; they were formerly on the altar, serving as a double tomb for the Barbarigo family, which once stood in the church of Santa Maria della Carità, which now houses part of the Gallerie dell'Accademia. The tombs were dismantled in 1808, but other pieces survive, including a kneeling effigy of Doge Agostino Barbarigo in marble and a relief in limestone depicting the Resurrection; another kneeling effigy, depicting Doge Marco Barbarigo, is also known to have at one time existed as part of the tomb. The complete tomb design is shown in an engraving from 1692; according to this the bronzes were placed on the altar of the central bay, flanked by the kneeling figures on either side. Further effigies, depicting figures reclining on a bier, were placed in each adjoining bay. Documentary evidence indicates that work on the sculpture was begun around 1486, at Marco Barbarigo's death; the reliefs were probably completed by 1515.
