= Catholice fidei defensionem =

Papal bull of Pope Innocent VIII in 1486

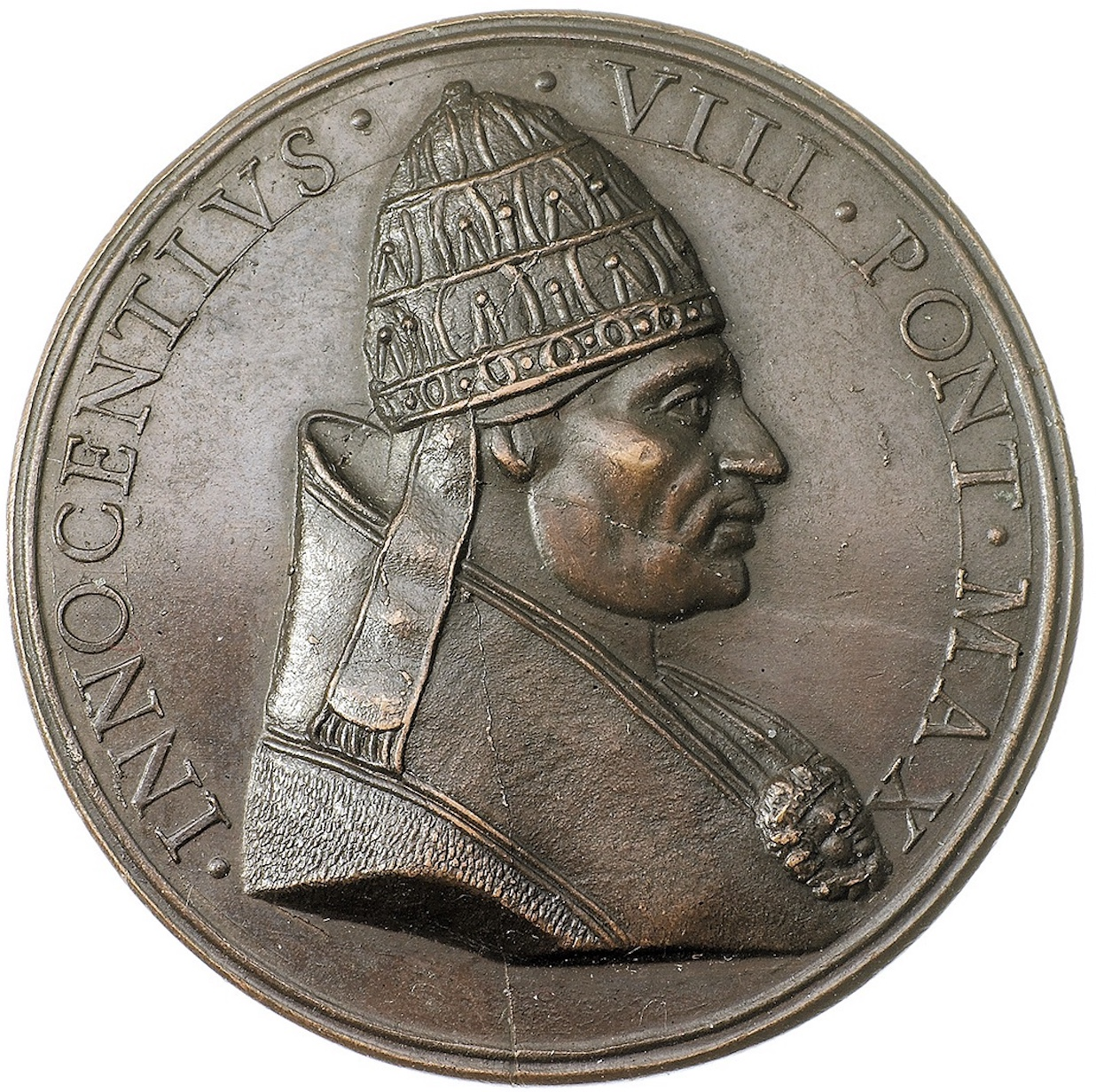
Pope Innocent VIII

Catholice fidei defensionem is a papal bull issued by Pope Innocent VIII on 12 July 1486 granting plenary indulgences to those who took part in Casimir IV Jagiellon's war against the Ottoman Empire.

The Church of the Holy Cross, Pătrăuți, opened by Stephen the Great in 1487, contains a painting of a procession of the saints to find and raise the Holy Cross. Recent scholarship has demonstrated a link between this painting and the bull.
