= Villa Barbarigo (Valsanzibio) =

Stately home in Italy

Coordinates: 45°17′37″N 11°43′24″E

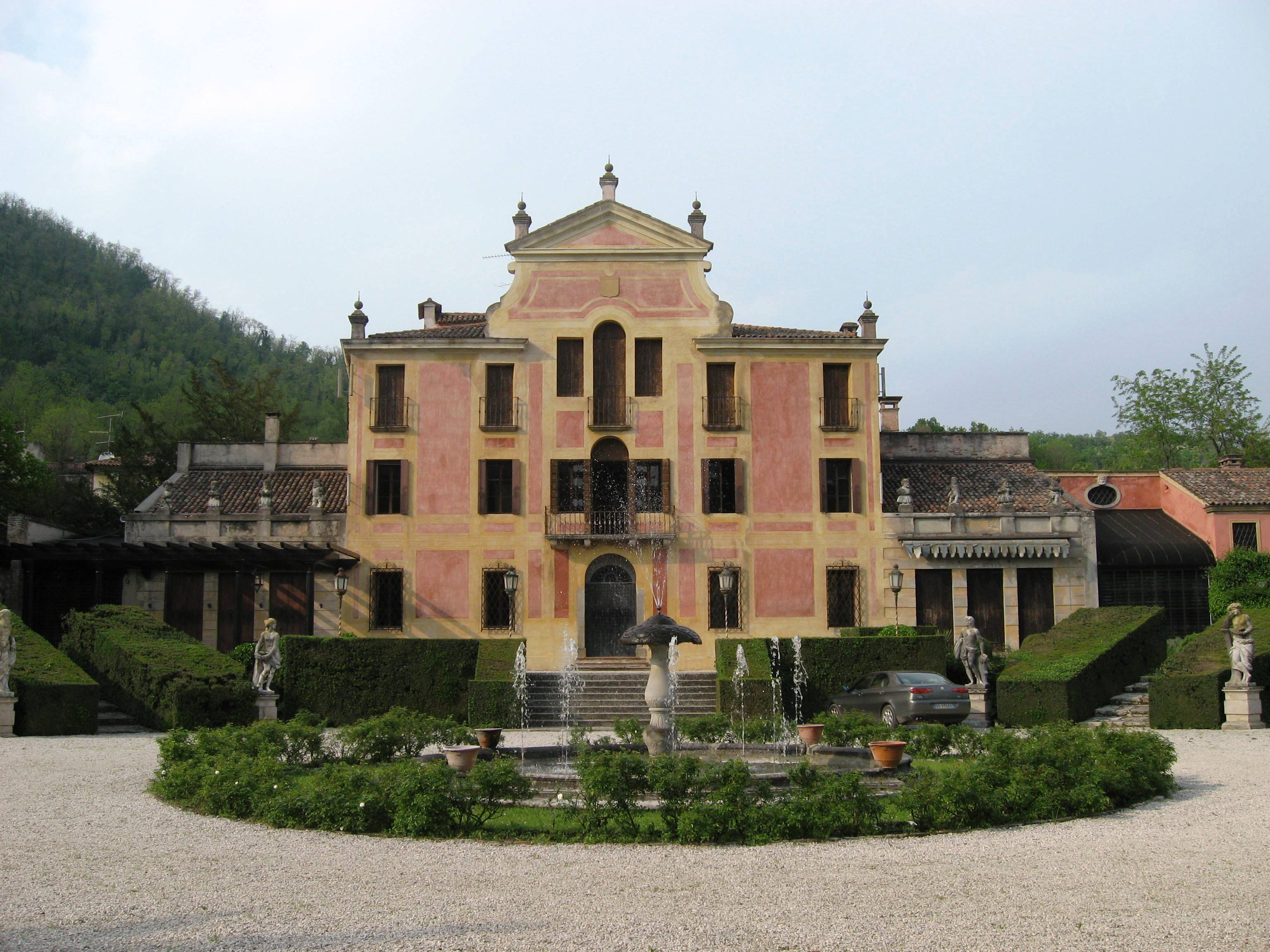
Facade of Villa

The Villa Barbarigo (also known as Villa Barbarigo Pizzoni Ardemani from its various proprietors) is a 17th-century rural villa, located on over 40 acres (160,000 m^{2}) at Valsanzibio, a frazione of Galzignano Terme, south of Padua, northern Italy; it was built by the Venetian aristocratic family of the Barbarigo.

== Description ==
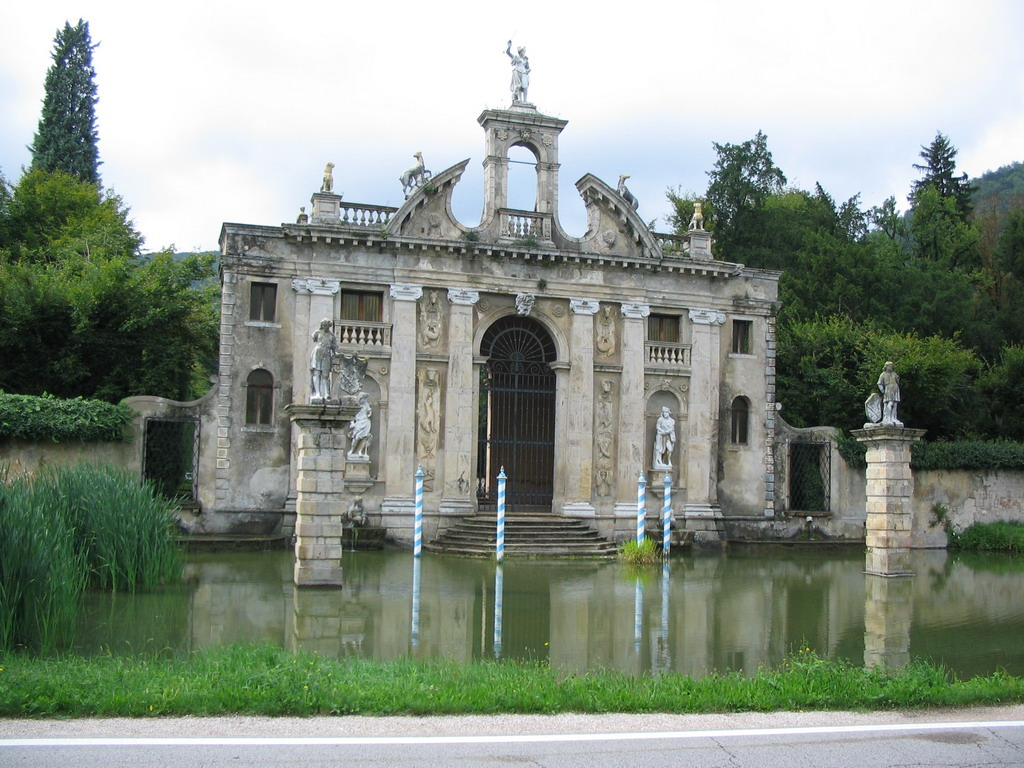
Main gate

It is girded by a remarkable Baroque garden and water works, with statuary (including a statue of aged and winged time carrying a cuboctahedron) and even a Boxwood labyrinth. Originally commissioned in 1669 by Zuane Francesco Barbarigo, the construction continued under Zuane's son, Gregorio Barbarigo, a Cardinal and future Saint, with designs by Luigi Bernini, brother of the famous Roman sculptor and architect. The sculpture was mainly completed by Enrico Merengo. The plan was meant to define the approach to the villa as an allegory of man's progress towards his own perfectibility or salvation.

The Villa was at one time accessible by boat from Venice, and the exuberant entry portal has the poles used in the city to tie up gondolas. The portal is pseudo palace facade with a broken pediment sporting a statue of Diana the hunter in the center, flanked by her dogs. Once through the gate, paths lead through a series of fountains and garden features, including water games. Some of the evergreen plantings date to the original gardens of the 17th-century. The gardens are accessible to visitors, but the villa remains private.

This villa should not be confused with Villa Barbarigo at Noventa Vicentina.
