= List of acts of the Parliament of Scotland from 1486 =

This is a list of acts of the Parliament of Scotland for the year 1486.

It lists acts of Parliament of the old Parliament of Scotland, that was merged with the old Parliament of England to form the Parliament of Great Britain, by the Union with England Act 1707 (c. 7).

For other years, see list of acts of the Parliament of Scotland. For the period after 1707, see list of acts of the Parliament of Great Britain.

== 1486 ==
Continuing the 13th parliament of James III.

Short title, or popular name	Citation	Royal assent
Long title
Currency Act 1486 (repealed)	1486 c. 1 (Note: This is the citation in the Record Edition.); 1483 c. 97 (Note: This is the citation in the Duodecimal Edition.)	1 March 1486
The crying doune of the new plakkis. The proclaiming done of the new placks. (Repealed by Statute Law Revision (Scotland) Act 1906 (6 Edw. 7. c. 38))
Tallow Act 1486 (repealed)	1486 c. 2 — (Note: This act is not listed in the Duodecimal Edition.)	1 March 1486
Anent the halding and keping of talloun within the realme. The holding and retaining of tallow within the realm. (Repealed by Statute Law Revision (Scotland) Act 1906 (6 Edw. 7. c. 38))
Hides Act 1486 (repealed)	1486 c. 3 —	1 March 1486
That na hydis saltit dry nor barkit be had out of the realme. That no hides, salted, dry or tanned, be exported from the realm. (Repealed by Statute Law Revision (Scotland) Act 1906 (6 Edw. 7. c. 38))

=== Sources ===
- Alexander, William (1841). "Acta Parliamentorum Regis Jacobi Tertii". An Abridgement of the Acts of the Parliaments of Scotland. Edinburgh: Adam and Charles Black. p. 445 – via Google Books.
- Alexander, William (1841). "Acta Parliamentorum Regis Jacobi Tertii". An Abridgement of the Acts of the Parliaments of Scotland. Edinburgh: Adam and Charles Black. p. 445 – via Google Books.
- Chronological Table of the Statutes. London: Her Majesty's Stationery Office. 1972. p. 1323 – via Google Books.
- "Index of Statutes: James III (1460-1488)". Records of the Parliaments of Scotland to 1707. University of St Andrews.

== See also ==
- List of legislation in the United Kingdom
- Records of the Parliaments of Scotland
