= Noventa Vicentina =

- Comune
- Comune di Noventa Vicentina
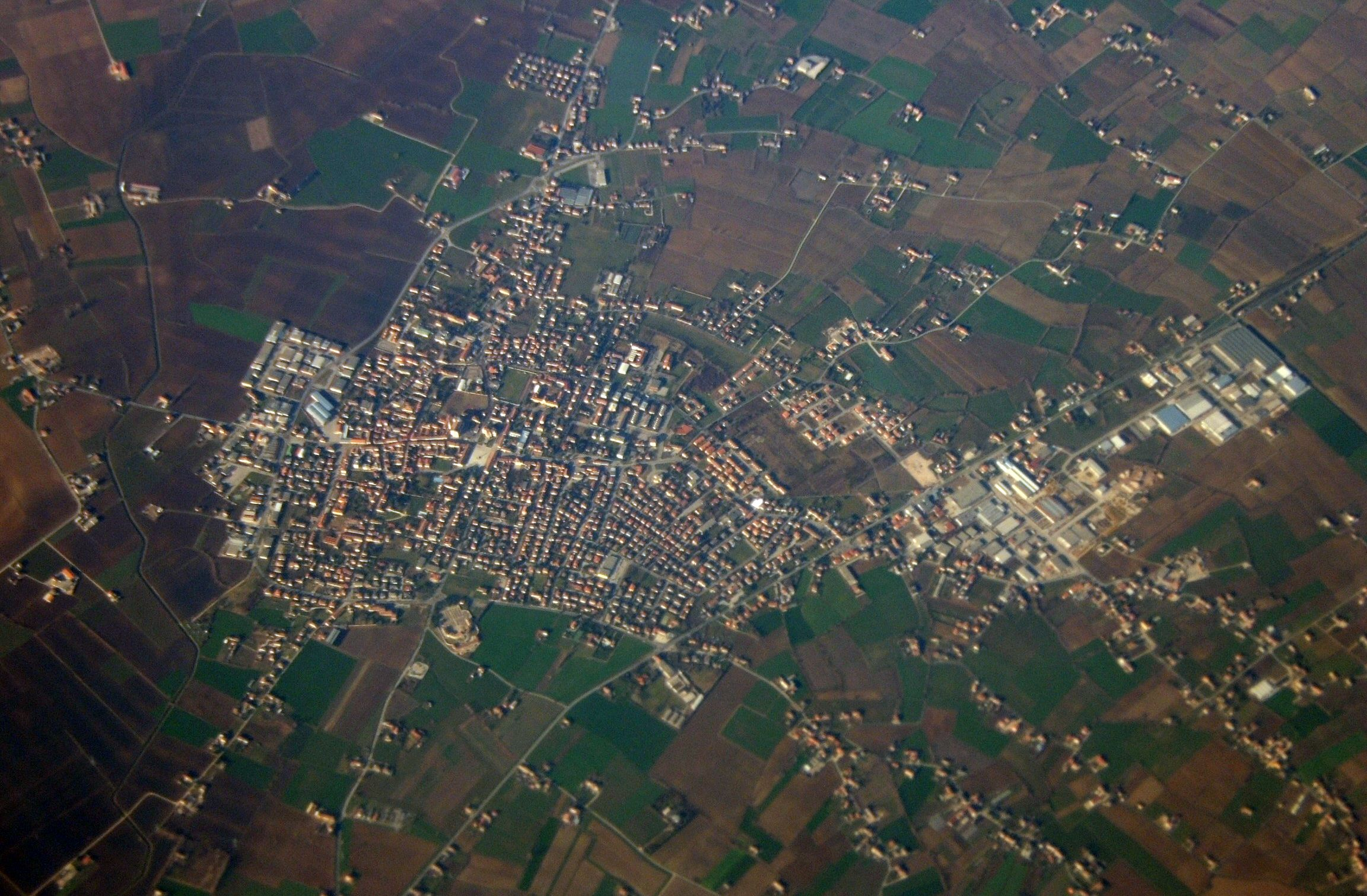
- Aerial view of Noventa Vicentina

- Coat of arms

- Location within Italy Location within Veneto
- Coordinates: 45°17′N 11°32′E
- Country: Italy
- Region: Veneto
- Province: Vicenza (VI)
- Frazioni: Caselle, Saline, Are

Government
  - Mayor: Marcello Spigolon

Area
  - Total: 23 km^{2} (8.9 sq mi)
- Elevation: 13 m (43 ft)

Population (30 November 2010)
  - Total: 8,911
  - Density: 390/km^{2} (1,000/sq mi)
- Time zone: UTC+1 (CET)
  - Summer (DST): UTC+2 (CEST)
- Postal code: 36025
- Dialing code: 0444
- Website: Official website

Noventa Vicentina is a town and comune in the province of Vicenza, Veneto, northern Italy.

== Infrastructure ==
It is west of SP247 provincial road.

== History ==
Noventa Vicentina was first inhabited by the Romans in the 1st century AD. Afterward in the early 1500s, the town was settled again by some Venetian Aristocrats. Noventa spent some time under the Republic of Venice but later became part of Austro-Hungarian Empire. In 1863 Noventa Vicentina was annexed by the Kingdom of Italy and has ever since been under the Italian Republic.

== Main Attractions ==
- Villa Barbarigo.
- Chiesa Parrocchiale dei SS. Vito, Modesto e Crescenzia
- Piazza IV Novembre, with the Town Hall, Duomo, Porticoes, the column, and the fountain.
- Villa Manin Canterella
- Teatro Modernissimo
- Villa Arnaldi Prosdocimi
- Villa Albrizzi
- Villa San Floriano
- Palazzo Stefani

== Twin towns ==
Noventa Vicentina is twinned with:

- Asiago, Italy

== Sources ==
- (Google Maps)
