= Treaty of Blois (1499) =

Military alliance between France and the Republic of Venice

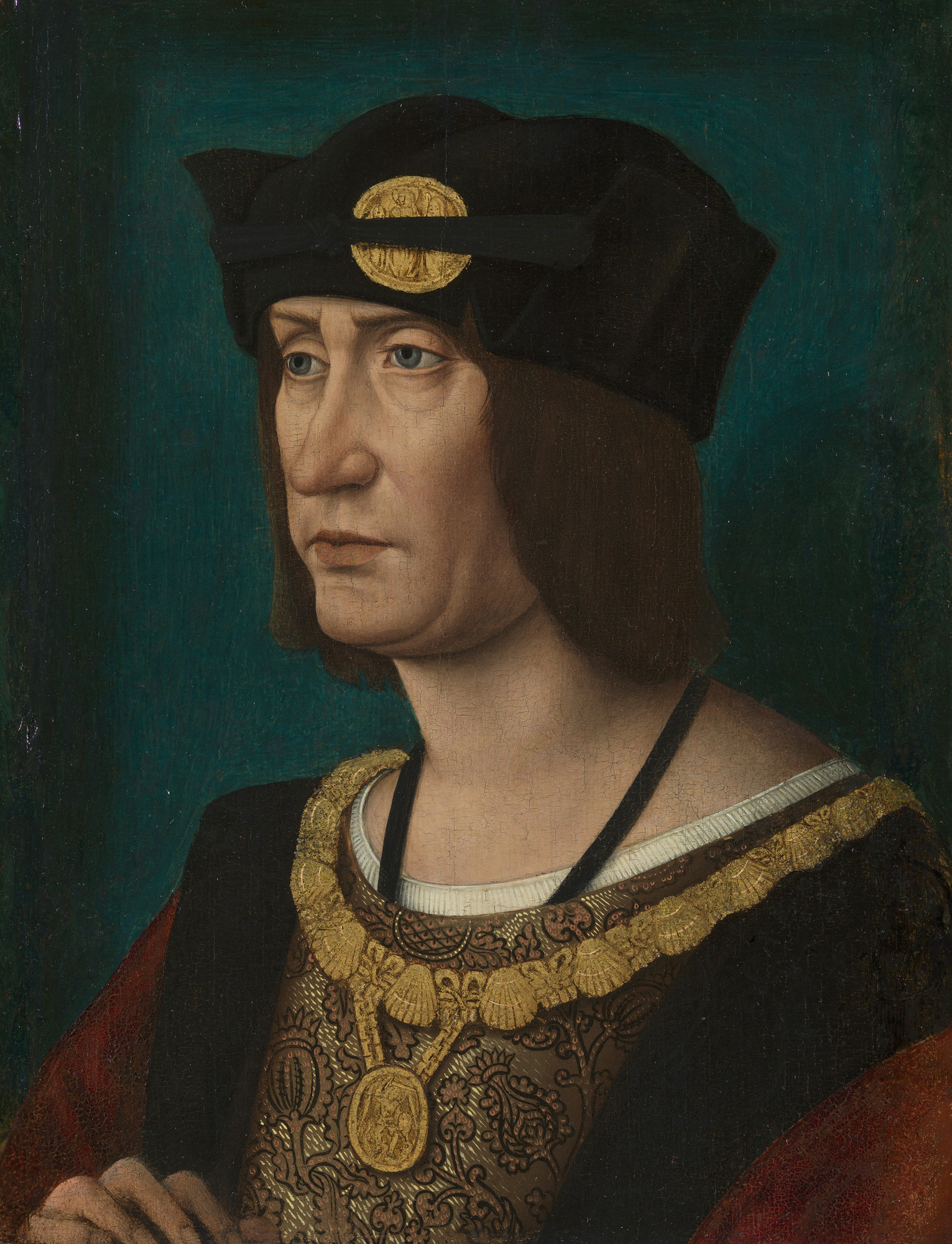
- Louis XII of France
- Signed: 9 February 1499
- Location: Blois, France
- Mediators: Ercole I d'Este, Duke of Ferrara
- Original signatories: (Kingdom of France) Louis XII; (Republic of Venice) Agostino Barbarigo
- Parties: France; Venice
- Languages: French

The Treaty of Blois (1499), signed on 9 February 1499, was a secret military alliance between Louis XII of France and the Republic of Venice, in which they agreed to a joint attack on the Duchy of Milan. In return, the Venetians were to receive part of the Duchy, while France also undertook to provide military assistance if Venice was attacked by the Ottoman Empire.

== Background ==
The Italian War of 1494–1495 began when Charles VIII of France invaded Italy to pursue the Angevin claim to the Kingdom of Naples. He was initially supported by Ludovico Sforza, Duke of Milan since October 1494, but in March 1495 Ludovico joined the anti-French League of Venice. Charles' cousin Louis of Orleans took advantage of this change of sides to attack the Duchy of Milan, which he claimed through his grandmother, Valentina Visconti. He captured Novara, fifty kilometres from Milan, where he was besieged by Milanese forces and eventually surrendered in return for his freedom.

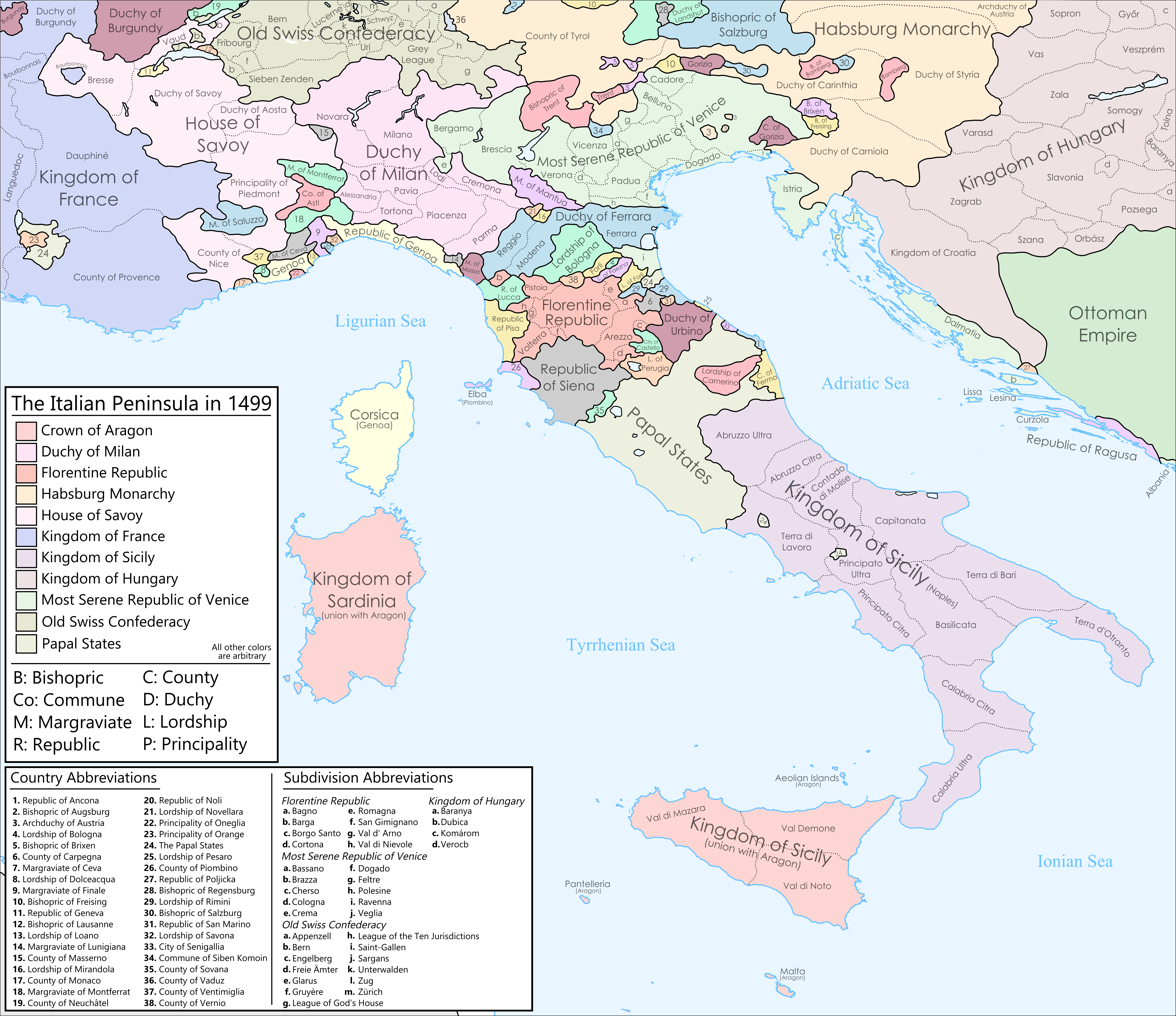
Italy in 1499

After Charles died in April 1498, Louis succeeded him as Louis XII. To secure his borders prior to another attempt on Milan, in July 1498 he renewed the 1492 Peace of Étaples with England and signed a treaty confirming French borders with Burgundy. In August, he signed the Treaty of Marcoussis with Ferdinand II of Aragon; although it left outstanding territorial disputes between France and Spain unresolved, the two countries agreed to "have all enemies in common, except the Pope".

Louis now approached the Republic of Venice, then the leading military power in Northern Italy. Venice had been financing Pisa in its fight for independence from Florence, which was supported by Milan. Doing so had proved extremely expensive while Venice was also concerned by the Ottoman threat to their maritime possessions. As a result, the Great Council was open to an alliance with France to remove Ludovico, although some members disagreed, including Agostino Barbarigo, the current Doge of Venice.

== Provisions ==
The Venetians initially demanded lands on both sides of the Adda river, which Louis considered excessive, while rejecting his request for a subsidy of 100,000 Ducats. Under a deal brokered by Ercole I d'Este, Duke of Ferrara, Venice was granted Cremona along with lands on the eastern bank of the Adda, and agreed to pay part of Louis' expenses. They would also supply 1,500 cavalry and 4,000 infantry for an attack on Milan from the east and agreed not to interfere with French plans to capture Genoa. In return, Louis promised to provide military support if the Ottomans attacked Venice while they were at war with Milan.

== Aftermath ==
Louis assembled an army of around 20,000 under Gian Giacomo Trivulzio, who invaded Milan in August 1499 while he remained in Lyon; with the bulk of Milanese forces in the western part of the duchy, the Venetians quickly occupied the eastern territories assigned to them by the treaty and captured Cremona on 8 September. Ludovico and his children took refuge in Germany with Emperor Maximilian, while Louis entered Milan on 6 October 1499.

However, tensions soon developed within the Franco-Venetian alliance, since the Venetians backed an independent Pisa while Louis needed Florentine support for his attack on Naples. In addition, the Milanese deeply resented their new French and Venetian overlords, a situation worsened by the heavy taxes imposed by Louis to pay for his military campaign. In April 1500, Ludovico retook Milan with the help of an army of mercenaries paid for by Emperor Maximilian but was later defeated and held in French captivity where in he died in 1508. As the new Duke of Milan, Louis could not escape the reality that Venice was its chief rival in Northern Italy and in 1508 France joined the anti-Venetian League of Cambrai, set up by Pope Julius II.

== Sources ==
- Gagné, John (2021). Milan Undone: Contested Sovereignties in the Italian Wars. Harvard University Press. ISBN 978-0674248724.
- Mallett, Michael; Shaw, Christine (2012). The Italian Wars: 1494–1559. Pearson Education. ISBN 978-0-582-05758-6.
- Romane, Julian (2020). The First and Second Italian Wars 1494-1504: Fearless Knights, Ruthless Princes and the Coming of Gunpowder Armies. Pen and Sword Military. ISBN 978-1526750518.
- Sanudo, Marin (1883). La spedizione di Carlo VIII in Italia (in Italian). Mancia del Commercio di M. Visentini.
