= Palazzo Barbarigo della Terrazza =

Palace in Venice, Italy

Coordinates: 45°26′09.99″N 12°19′46.47″E

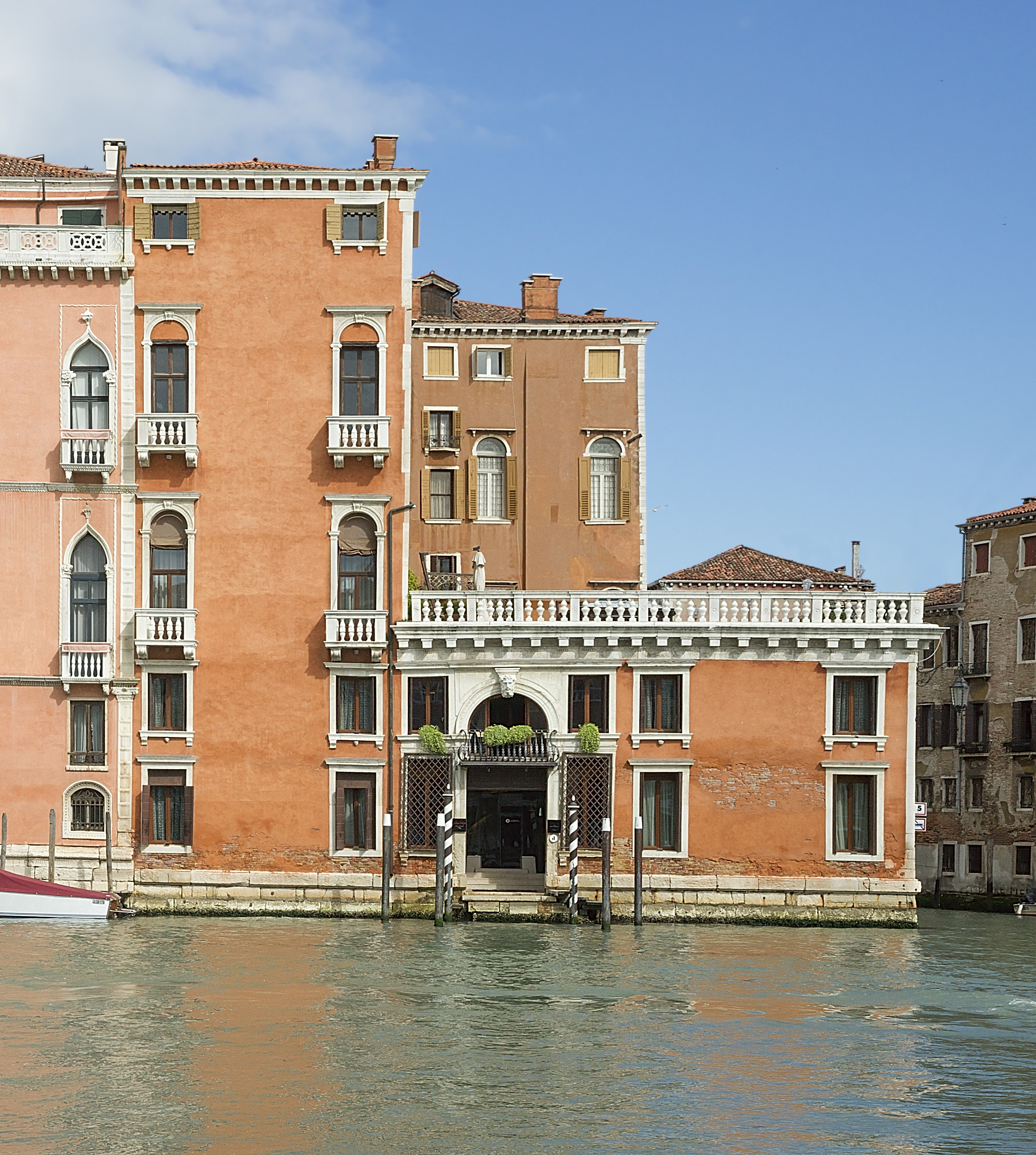
Grand Canal façade

The Palazzo Barbarigo dalla Terrazza is a Renaissance-style palace on the Grand Canal, across the Rio San Polo from the Palazzo Cappello Layard and adjacent to the Palazzo Pisani Moretta in the sestiere of San Polo, in Venice, Italy. In 2015, it housed the Centro Tedesco di Studi Veneziani.

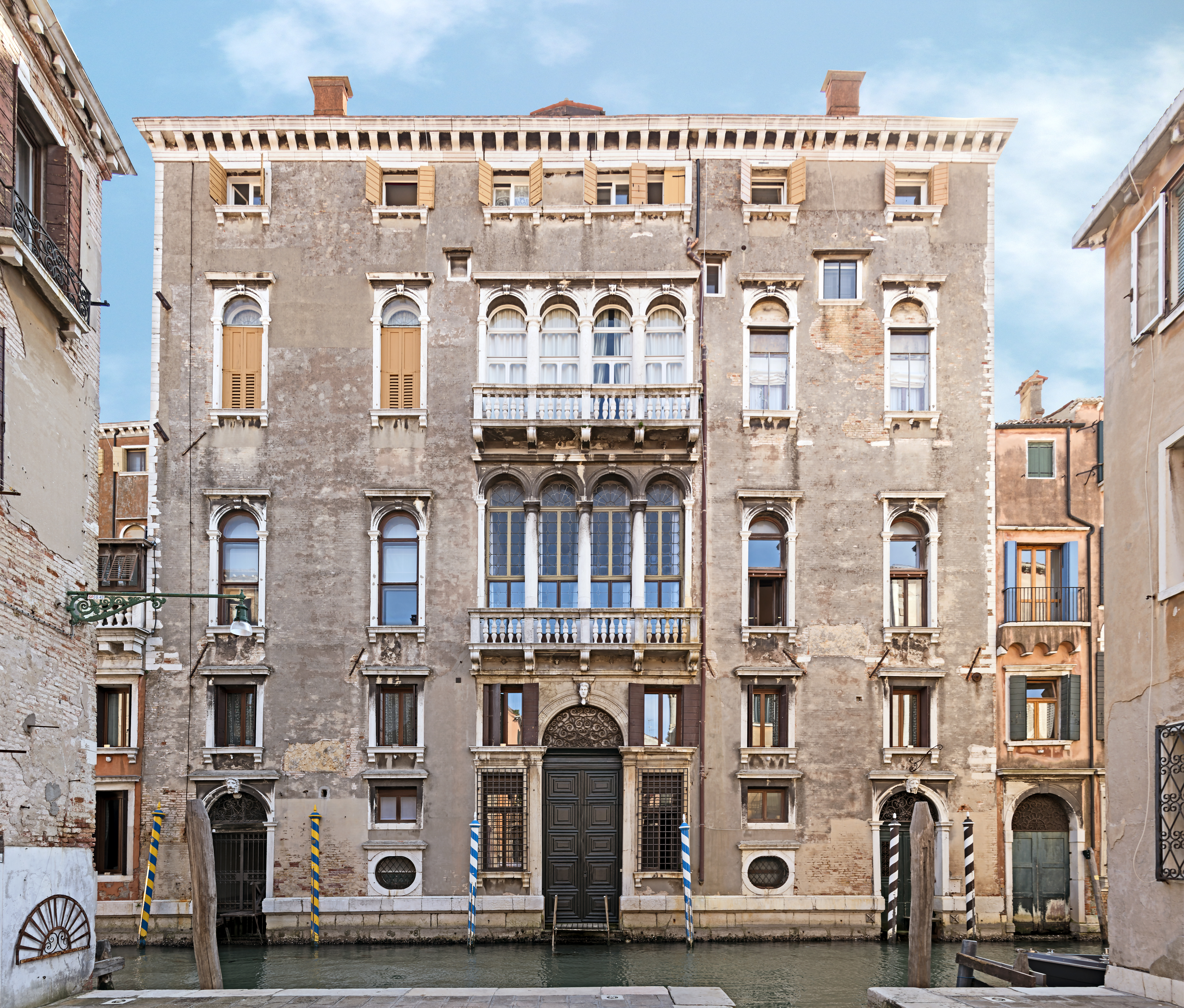
Rio San Polo façade

== History ==
The patrician Daniele Barbarigo commissioned the palace from the architect Bernardin Contin, and construction took place during 1566–1570. The Barbarigo collection that included a number of Titian paintings was sold to czars during the 1850s, and is now displayed in the Hermitage. Some of the renaissance decoration of some rooms is still in place. Known for a large terrace overlooking the Grand Canal
