= Palazzo Grimani Marcello =

Palace in Venice, Italy

Coordinates: 45.4363°N 12.3304°E

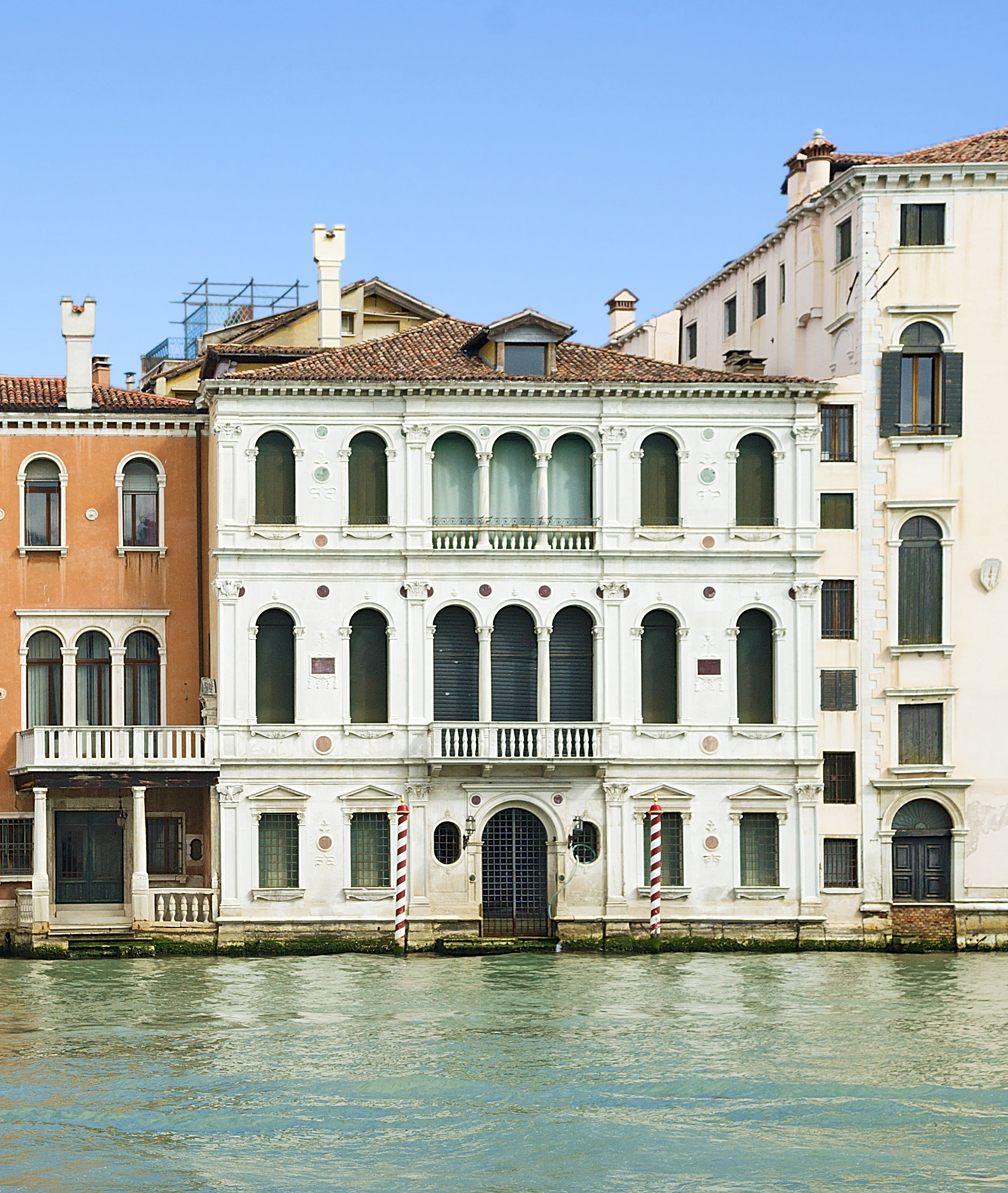
Canal Facade

The Palazzo Grimani Marcello, also known as Giustinian Querini, is a Renaissance-style palace in located on the Grand Canal, between the Palazzo Querini Dubois and the Palazzo Cappello Layard in the sestiere of San Polo of Venice, Italy.

A palace at the site originally belonged to the Giustiniani family; the original design is attributed to the studio of Martino Lombardo in the sixteenth century. At the death of Antonio Giustinian in 1732, his daughter Francesca, wife of Piero Grimani, inherited the palace.
