= Barbarigo family =

Venetian patrician family

Barbarigo
- Country: Republic of Venice
- Founded: 9th century
- Titles: Doge of Venice
- Dissolution: 1843

The Barbarigo were a patrician, noble Venetian family, whose members had an important role in the history of the Republic of Venice.

== History ==
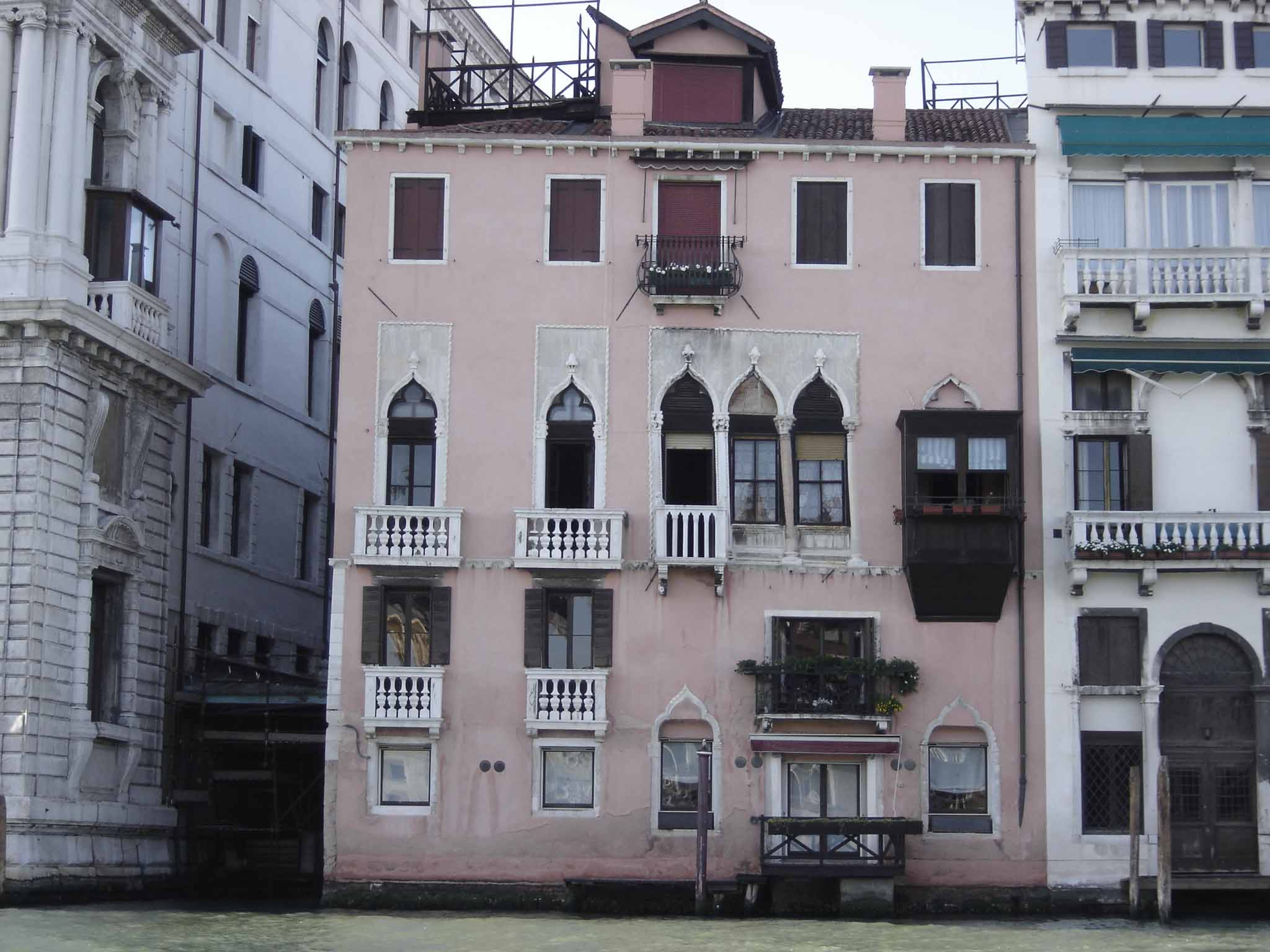
The Palazzo Barbarigo Minotto on the Canal Grande in Venice

The family originated from the Istrian area (according to the tradition, their ancestral place was Muggia, near Trieste). Also according to the family legend, in 880 AD one Arrigo won a battle against Saracen pirates and returned victoriously home with the beards (barba in Italian) of the defeated enemies, thus originating the family name Barbarigo and the coat of arms, representing six beards.

The Barbarigo were among the most influential Venetian families and have generated bishops, cardinals and patriarchs, including Gregorio Barbarigo, who was born in the Palazzo Barbarigo Minotto in 1625. In 955, the Barbarigo founded the first church of Santa Maria del Giglio, known as Santa Maria Zobenigo at the time.

The family remained part of the Venetian patricians after the Serrata del Maggior Consiglio in 1297.

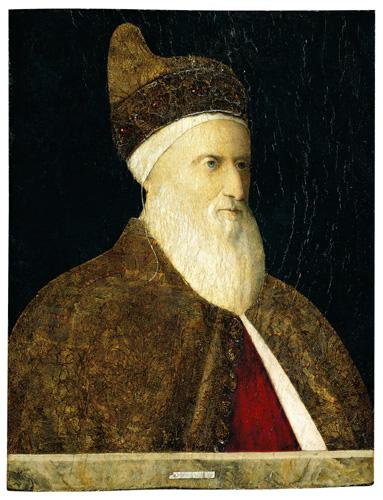
Doge Agostino Barbarigo reigned 1486 until 1501, by Gentile Bellini

Two members of the family became doges of Venice. The first, Marco, ruled the Republic in 1485-86 and was the first Doge to be crowned on the Giants Staircase of Palazzo Ducale. His reign was so short due to a fatal wrangle he had during a senate meeting with his brother and successor, Agostino. Agostino Barbarigo reigned from 1486 until 1501, the period in which Catherine Cornaro, queen of Cyprus, donated her kingdom to Venice. He introduced the habit of kissing the Doge's hand.

The Barbarigo family died out in 1843 with Giovanni Filippo Barbarigo, who died childless.

== Prominent members ==
- Angelo Barbarigo (1350–1418), bishop and cardinal of Verona.
- Marco Barbarigo di Croia (fl. 1388–d. 1428), governor of Croia
- Marco Barbarigo (1413–1486), Doge of Venice.
- Agostino Barbarigo (1419–1501), brother of Marco, succeeded him as Doge.
- Agostino Barbarigo (1516–1571), captain general and head during the battle of Lepanto.
- St. Gregorio Barbarigo (1625–1697), cardinal and Saint.
- Marcantonio Barbarigo (1640–1706), cardinal.
- Giovanni Francesco Barbarigo (1658–1730), cardinal and nephew of Gregorio.

== Houses ==
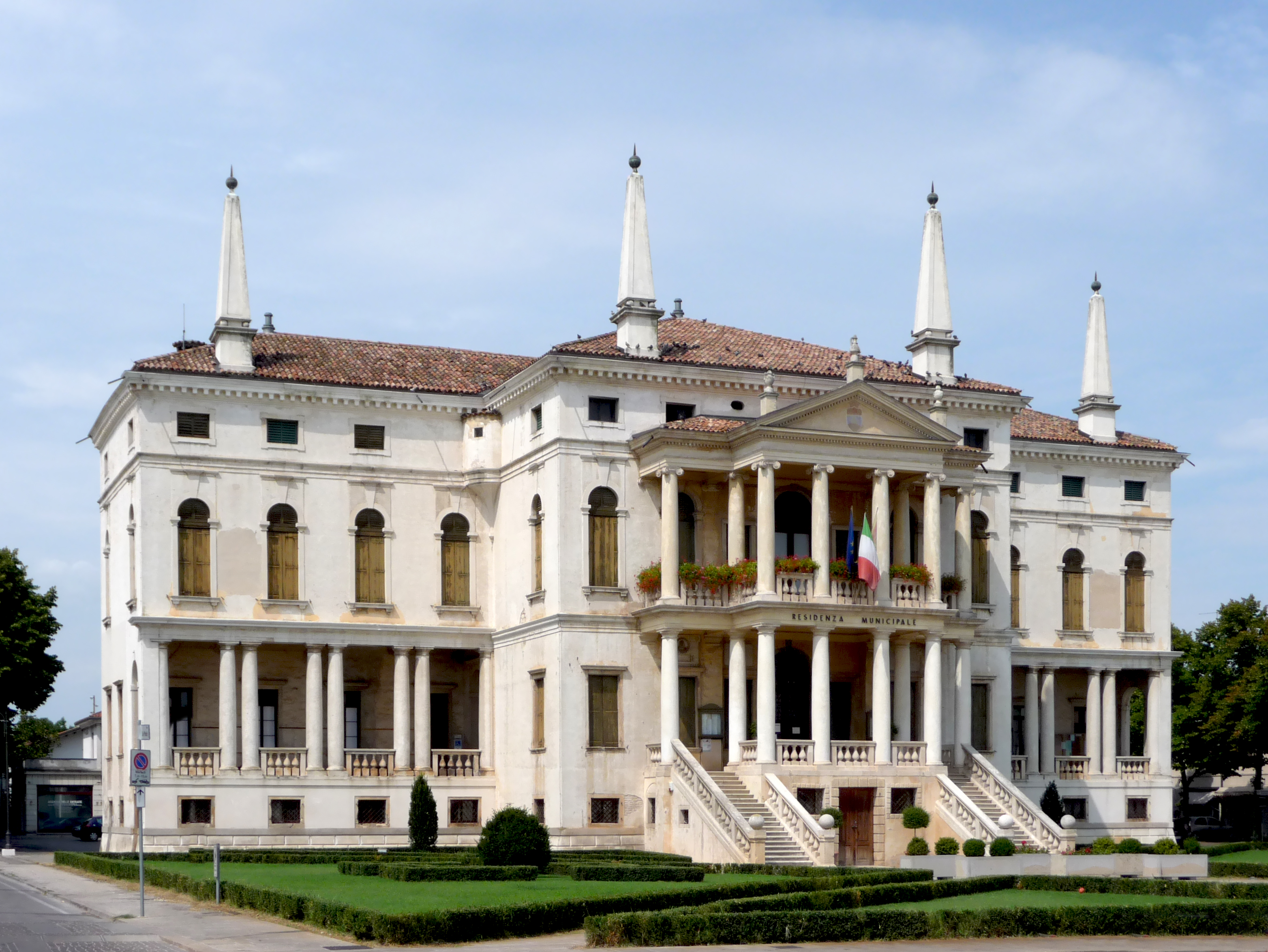
Villa Barbarigo, Noventa Vicentina

- Palazzo Barbarigo
- Palazzo Barbarigo Minotto
- Palazzo Barbarigo Nani Mocenigo
- Palazzo Barbarigo della Terrazza

- all these are on the Grand Canal of Venice

- Villa Barbarigo, Galzignano Terme, near Padua.
- Villa Barbarigo, Noventa Vicentina, near Vicenza.

== Sources ==
- Spreti, Vittorio (1928–36). Enciclopedia storico-nobiliare italiana. Vol. 8. Milan: Forni. p. 156.
