= Jacomo Barbarigo =

Venitian governor of Morea

Jacomo Barbarigo was a Venetian commentator and also the governor of Morea.

During the 15th century, he wrote a series of dispatches pertaining to the military events that transpired in the Peloponnesus. These letters were written between 1465 and 1466. One such letter written in August 1465 mentioned the Castle of Listrena (or Listrina).
