= Carlo Carraro =

Italian economist and academic

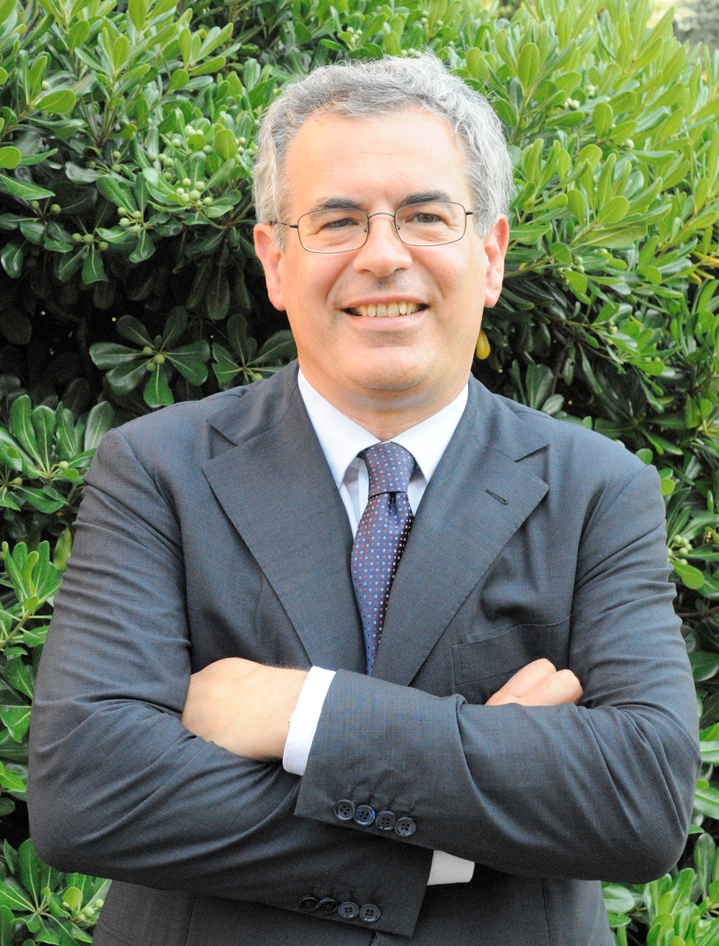
- Carraro in 2015
- Born: May 17, 1957 (age 69); Italy
- Known for: Work on environmental and climate economics; policy modelling; contributions to the IPCC
- Awards: Grand Officer of the Order of Merit of the Italian Republic (2013)

Academic background
- Education: Ca' Foscari University of Venice (Laurea); Princeton University (Ph.D.)

Carlo Carraro (born 17 May 1957) is an Italian economist and academic specializing in environmental economics, climate policy, and sustainable development. He is Professor of Environmental Economics at Ca’ Foscari University of Venice, where he also served as President/Rector from 2009 to 2014. In 2005 he founded the Euro-Mediterranean Centre on Climate Change (CMCC) of which he is now a strategic advisor. He is a member of the Senior Advisory Group of the Green Growth Knowledge Platform (World Bank), and President Emeritus of Ca’ Foscari University of Venice. He has played leading roles in the Intergovernmental Panel on Climate Change (IPCC), serving as member of the Bureau and Vice-Chair of Working Group III from 2008 to 2023.

== Education ==
Carraro graduated with a Laurea in Economics from Ca’ Foscari University of Venice in 1981. He earned a Ph.D. in Economics from Princeton University in 1985, supported by a Fulbright Fellowship.

== Academic career ==
Carraro began his academic career as an assistant professor at Ca’ Foscari University in 1983 and became a full professor of economics at the University of Udine in 1990 before going back to Ca’ Foscari in 1993 2. At Ca’ Foscari, he served as Vice-Rector for Research Policy (2000–2005), Director of the Department of Economics (2005–2008), and Rector (2009–2014). As Rector, he led internationalization initiatives, promoted research networks, and oversaw the university’s participation in European higher-education alliances. Under Carraro’s rectorship, Ca’ Foscari University launched a plan of structural renewal in administrative, teaching, and research functions to adapt to new national evaluation standards (ANVUR), which contributed to improved performance in national evaluations (notably in humanities and languages).

He has also taught at the University of Paris 1 Panthéon-Sorbonne, LUISS Guido Carli (Rome), the University of Udine, Aix-Marseille University, the University of Nice, Paris X Nanterre.

== Fellowships and roles ==
Carraro is a research fellow of the Center for Economic and Policy Research (CEPR, London), CESifo (Munich), and associate research fellow at CEPS (Brussels). He has held leadership roles including President of the European Association of Environmental and Resource Economists (EAERE; President in 2018–2019), Scientific Director of FEEM from 2007 to 2017, Chair of the Executive Board of the European Institute on Economics and the Environment (EIEE), Coordinator of the academic activities of H-Farm College, and President of the Italian National Committee on Climate Change Impacts on Infrastructures and Mobility. He has also served on EU–DG ECFIN’s High-Level Advisory Group.

== Scientific activities ==
Carraro has been a member of the International Advisory Board of the Harvard Environmental Economics Program and of the European Research Council Advanced Grants Evaluation Panel. He has also served on scientific committees including the Research Network on Sustainable Development (R2D2) in Paris, the Istituto di Economia e Politica dell'Energia e dell'Ambiente (IEFE) in Milan, the ENI Award for Research, and the Kyoto Project of the Fondazione Lombardia Ambiente.

He was elected a corresponding member of the Academy Istituto Veneto di Scienze, Lettere e Arti in 2007. Carraro is a member of Academia Europaea and has been active in the Mercator Research Institute on Global Commons and Climate Change (MCC) in Berlin, the Green Growth Knowledge Platform, Green Budget Europe, and the World Economic Forum (WEF) Expert Network.

He has served on the advisory boards of institutions such as the Ifo Institute for Economic Research in Munich, the BP Chair on Sustainable Development at the Pontifical University of Comillas in Madrid, and the Centre for Applied Macroeconomic Analysis in Canberra. He has also been a member of the Executive Board of Venice Gateway for Science and Technologies (VEGA) and of the Steering Committees of the Ca’ Foscari–Harvard Summer School, the International Energy Workshop, and the Coalition Theory Network.

Carraro has played organizational roles in major conferences, chairing the Annual Conference of the European Association of Environmental and Resource Economists (1990) and the First World Congress of Environmental and Resource Economists (1998), both held in Venice.

=== Editorial Boards ===
Professor Carraro is member of the editorial board of the following journals: Review of Environmental Economics and Policy (Oxford University Press), Environmental Modelling and Assessment (Springer Science), Energy Economics (Elsevier), Research in Economics (Elsevier), Integrated Assessment (Springer Science), International Environmental Agreements (Springer Science), International Yearbook of Environmental and Resource Economics (Edward Elgar), Economics Bulletin (Vanderbilt University), E-conomics (Kiel Institute), Equilibri (Il Mulino), Strategic Behavior and the Environment (Nowpublishers).

== Research ==
Carraro’s research focuses on environmental and climate economics, coalition theory, and international environmental agreements. He has contributed to the development of integrated assessment models linking climate science and economics and has analyzed the economic impacts of mitigation and adaptation strategies.

He has published more than 300 journal articles and book chapters and is the author or editor of over 40 books, including works on sustainable development, energy economics, and international climate negotiations. His research has appeared in journals such as Environmental and Resource Economics, Journal of Public Economics, Energy Economics, Review of Environmental Economics and Policy, and Nature Climate Change.

== Publications ==
Carraro has written more than 200 papers and 30 books on the analysis of monetary and fiscal problems in open economies, monetary policy coordination in Europe, international negotiations and the formation of international economic coalitions, the effects of fiscal policies on oligopolistic markets, the econometric modelling of integrated economies, the econometric valuation of environmental policies to control global warming and further issues related to climate change policies, the dynamics of international environmental agreements, international locations industry and trade flows, global governance, coalition theory and research policies.

== Honours and awards ==
- Grand Officer of the Order of Merit of the Italian Republic (2013).
- Fellow of the Association of Environmental and Resource Economists (2016).
- President of the European Association of Environmental and Resource Economists (2018–2019).
- Fellow of the European Association of Environmental and Resource Economists (2020)
- Member of Academia Europaea (elected 2020).
- Paul Harris Fellow, Rotary International (2014).
- Melvin Jones Fellow, Lions International (2011).
- Sustainable Energy Prize, Italian Association of Energy Economists (2009).
- Resident Member of the “Istituto Veneto di Scienze, Lettere e Arti”
- Fulbright Fellowship (1982).

== Controversies ==
During his tenure as Rector of Ca’ Foscari University, several administrative decisions attracted criticism and debate:

- In 2010, the invitation to Paolo Scaroni, then managing director of ENI, to speak at the academic year’s inauguration led to protests due to Scaroni’s past legal history.
- In 2011, the invitation of Alessandro Profumo, former UniCredit managing director under tax fraud investigation, was also contested, even though Profumo was never indicted.
- In 2013, a proposed exchange of university buildings, including historical palaces, for a modern office block generated concerns from faculty and students regarding transparency and governance. The proposal was met with petitions and demonstrations, and the proposed exchange was quickly dismissed.
