= Villa Barbarigo, Noventa Vicentina =

Patrician villa in Noventa Vicentina, Vicenza, Italy

Coordinates: 45.291132°N 11.539625°E

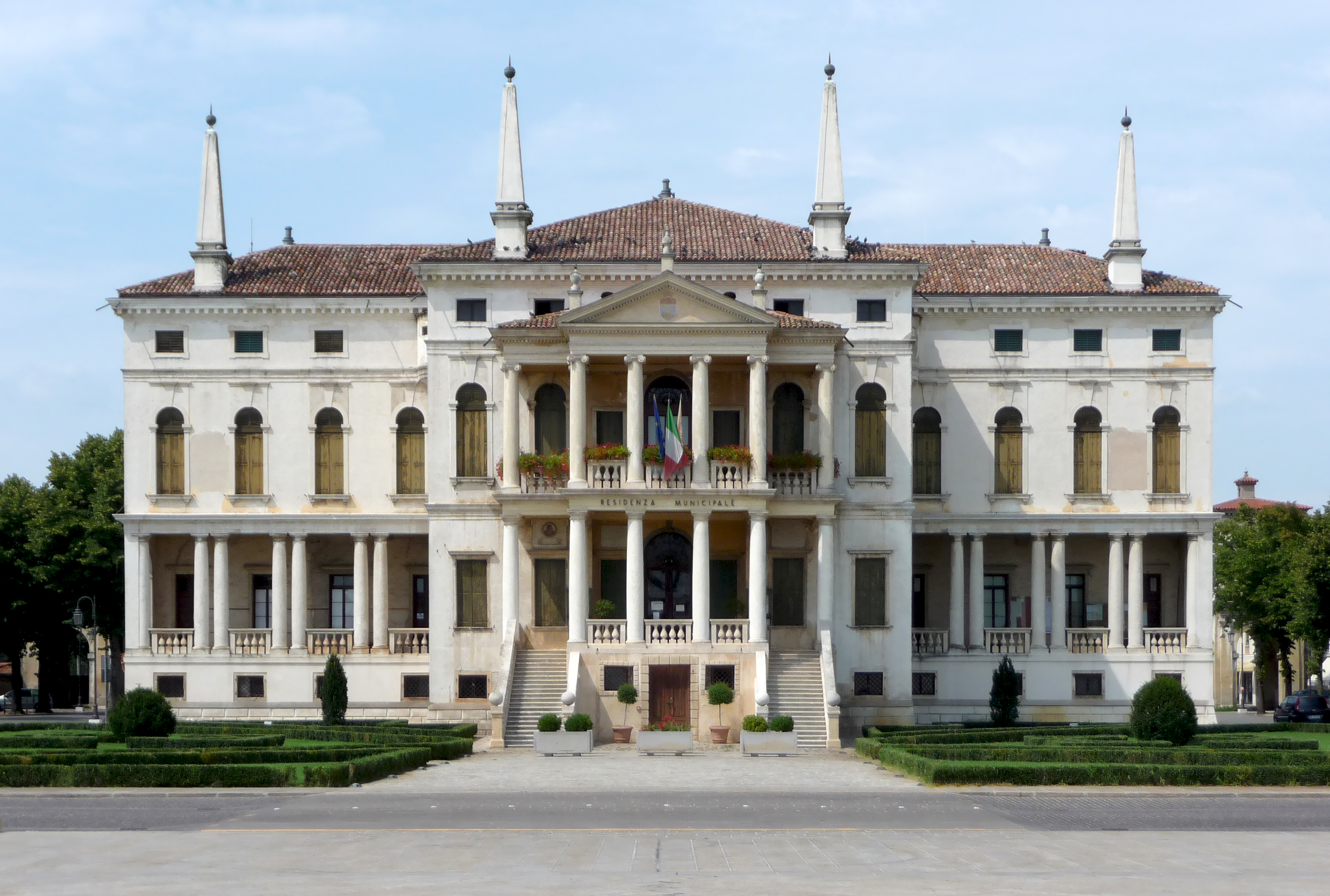
Villa Barbarigo in Noventa Vicentina

The Villa Barbarigo is a patrician villa in the comune of Noventa Vicentina, in Province of Vicenza, northern Italy, also referred to as Villa Barbarigo Loredan Rezzonico reflecting the various marriage alliances among aristocratic Venetian families who have owned the house, is a rural palace built in the late 16th century.

In 1588, the Barbarigo family had commissioned the building from a generally unknown Veronese architect, who was familiar with Andrea Palladio's works. In the 1620s, the villa passed through marriage to the Loredan family, who owned it until 1755, when it passed to the Rezzonico.

The structure is imposing for its height and elaborate adornment of loggias and porticos. The villa is notable for its fresco decorations by artists such as Antonio Foler, Antonio Vassilacchi (the Aliense), and Luca Ferrari from Reggio.

The villa Barbarigo is used as the Town Hall of Noventa Vicentina.

Must not be confused with the Villa Barbarigo a Valsanzibio near Padua, which is renowned for its elaborate gardens and garden sculpture and statuary.

== See also ==
- Villa Barbarigo (Valsanzibio)
