= Marco Barbarigo =

Doge of Venice from 1485 to 1486

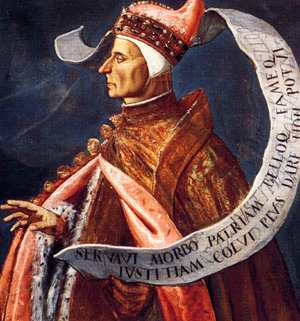
- Domenico Robusti, Ritratto del doge Marco Barbarigo.

73rd Doge of Venice
- In office 1485–1486
- Preceded by: Giovanni Mocenigo
- Succeeded by: Agostino Barbarigo

Personal details
- Born: 1413 Venice, Republic of Venice
- Died: August 14, 1486 (aged 73) Venice, Republic of Venice
- Spouse: Lucia Ruzzini
- Parent: Francesco Barbarigo (father)
- Relatives: Agostino Barbarigo
- Occupation: Noble

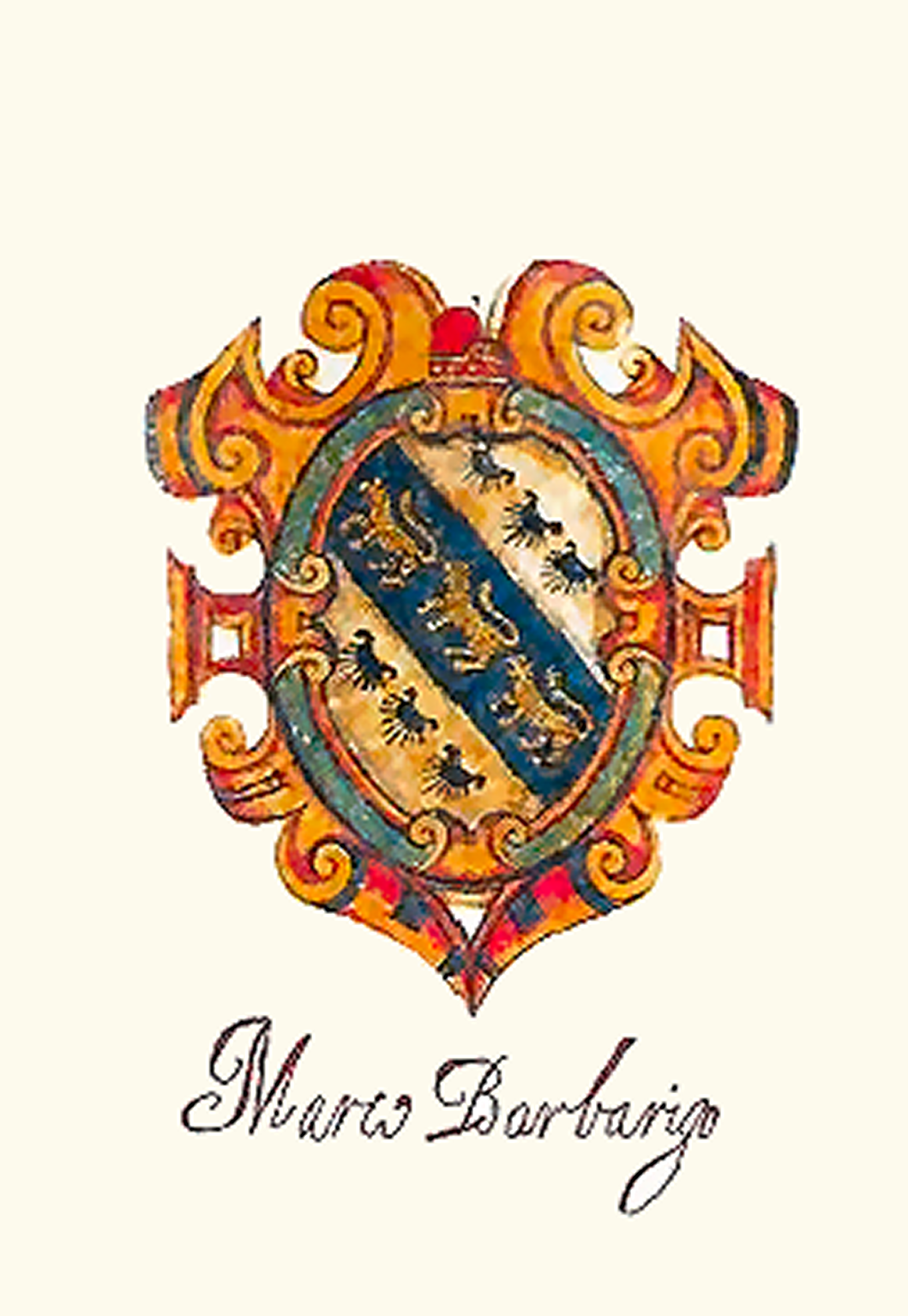
Coat of arms of Marco Barbarigo

Marco Barbarigo (c. 1413 – August 14, 1486) was the 73rd Doge of Venice from 1485 until 1486. His nomination took place on a new staircase in the courtyard of the Doge's Palace, on an axis with the Campanile of St. Mark and the Porta della Carta.

Barbarigo was elected as Doge of Venice in September 1485 to succeed Doge Giovanni Mocenigo, who was possibly poisoned. Marco died in August 1486, less than a year after becoming Doge, probably in a violent dispute between nobles caused by his brother Agostino. He was succeeded as Doge by Agostino Barbarigo, who was Procurator while Marco was Doge, from 1486 until 1501.

== Family ==
His dogaressa was Lucia Ruzzini (d. 1496), described as a hypochondriac but talented beauty. His father was Francesco Barbarigo and his brother was Agostino Barbarigo. He and his brother are the namesakes of the Master of the Barbarigo Reliefs, who was responsible for the creation of their tomb.

== Popular culture ==
- Marco Barbarigo appears in the video game Assassin's Creed II as a villain, and one of the main character's assassination targets. Barbarigo is depicted as being a puppet of the Knights Templar Grand Master Rodrigo Borgia, and his ally, the fictional Council of Ten member Carlo Grimaldi, who kills Doge Giovanni Mocenigo to allow Barbarigo to become the next Doge and take over Venice for the Templars. Barbarigo is killed by a member of the rival Assassin Order, Ezio Auditore da Firenze, with a hidden gun while holding a speech on a boat during Carnevale.

== Bibliography ==
- Bowden, Oliver (2009). Assassin's Creed: Renaissance. Penguin Books Limited. p. 528. ISBN 9780141046303.
- Paoletti, John T.; Radke, Gary M. (2005). Art in Renaissance Italy. Laurence King Publishing. p. 576. ISBN 9781856694391.
- Staley, Edgcumbe (1910). University of California Libraries (ed.). The dogaressas of Venice: The wives of the doges. London: T. W. Laurie. p. 430.

Political offices
Preceded by Giovanni Mocenigo	Doge of Venice; 1485–1486	Succeeded by Agostino Barbarigo
