= Agostino Barbarigo =

Doge of Venice from 1486 to 1501

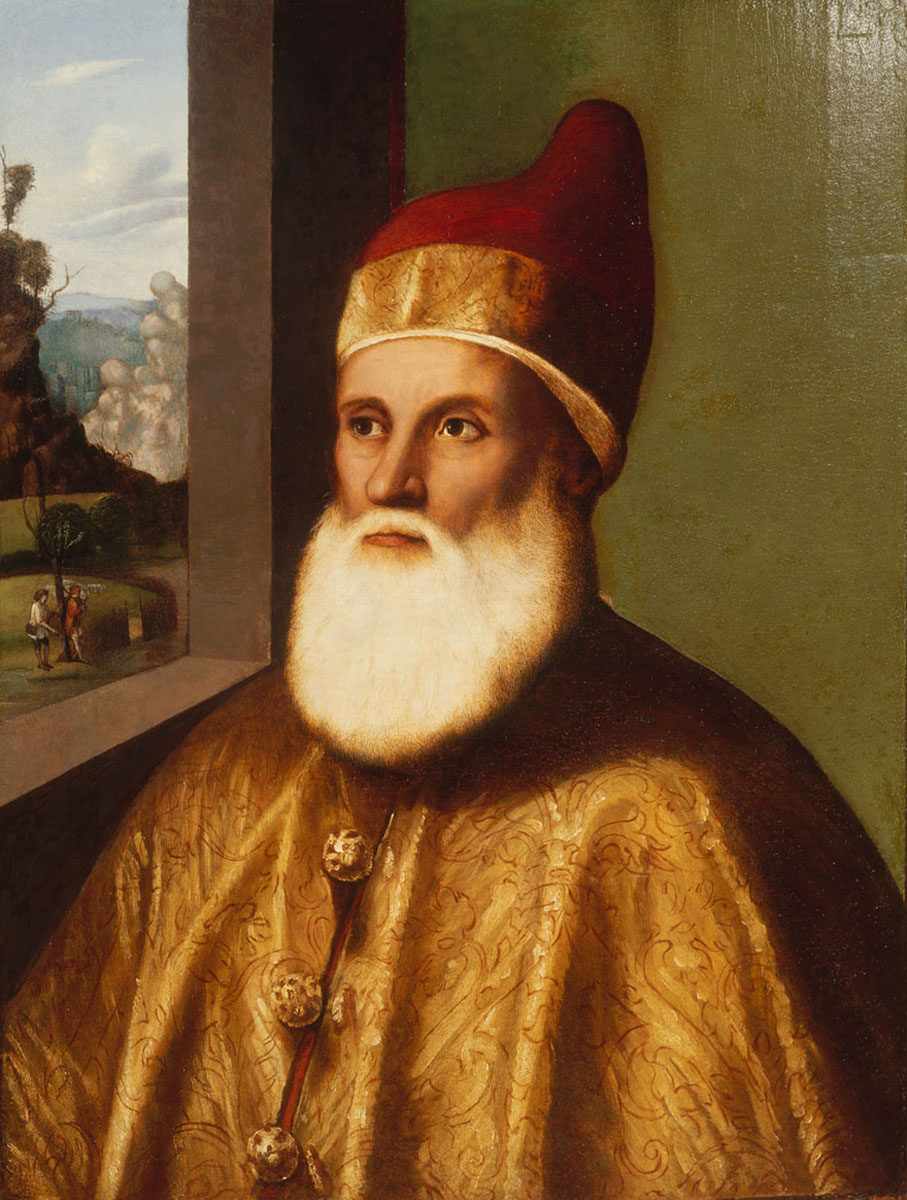
- Portrait by Marco Basaiti

Doge of Venice
- In office 1486–1501
- Preceded by: Marco Barbarigo
- Succeeded by: Leonardo Loredan

Personal details
- Born: 3 June 1419 Venice, Republic of Venice
- Died: 20 September 1501 (aged 82) Venice, Republic of Venice

Military service
- Battles/wars: Ottoman–Venetian War (1499–1503)

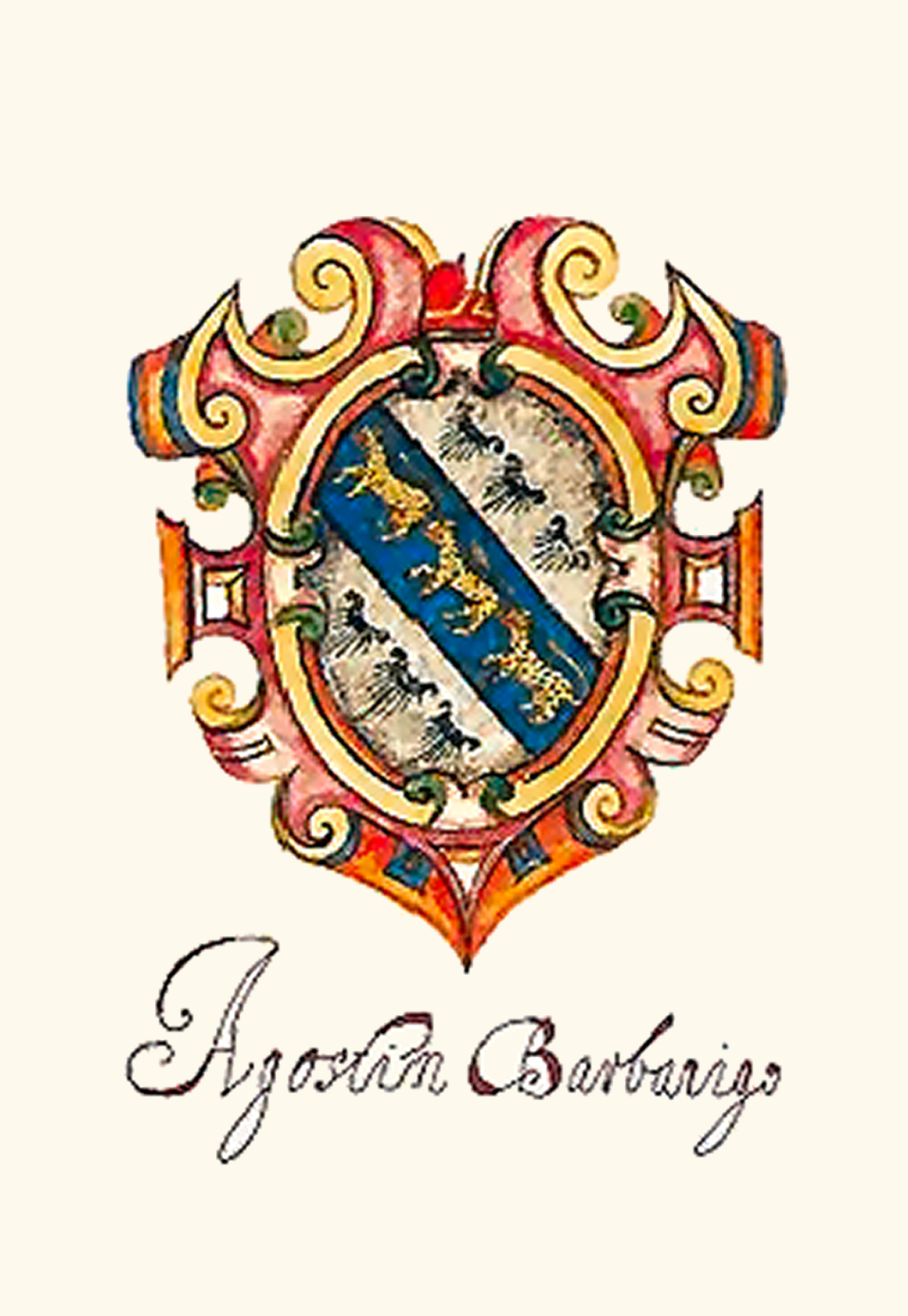
Coat of arms of Agostino Barbarigo

Agostino Barbarigo (3 June 1419 – 20 September 1501) was Doge of Venice from 1486 until his death in 1501.

While he was Doge, the imposing Clock Tower in the Piazza San Marco with its archway through which the street known as the Merceria leads to the Rialto, was designed and completed. A figure of the Doge was originally shown kneeling before the lion of Venice on the top storey below the bell but this was removed by the French in 1797 after Venice had surrendered to Napoleon.

In 1495 he created an Italian coalition to push back Charles VIII of France from Italy, which led to the Battle of Fornovo during the French retreat from Italy. During his reign Venice gained several strongholds in Romagna and annexed the island of Cyprus.

His relationships with the Ottoman sultan Bayezid II were initially amicable, but they became increasingly strained starting from 1492, eventually leading to open war in 1499. The Venetian merchants in Istanbul were arrested, while Bosnian troops invaded Dalmatia and reached Zara. The Venetian fleet was defeated at the Battle of Zonchio, and the Republic lost its base in Lepanto. The latter was soon followed by Modone and Corone, which meant the loss of all the main intermediate stops for the Venetian ships sailing towards the Levante.

Despite his personal opposition, in February 1499 Venice signed the Treaty of Blois, a military alliance with Louis XII of France against their long-standing rival, the Duchy of Milan. Barbarigo believed it to be a distraction from the Ottoman threat; a peace treaty was signed in 1503, which left Venice holding only Nafplion, Patras and Monemvasia in Morea.

His dogaressa was Elisabetta Soranzo. His brother Marco Barbarigo preceded him as Doge but held office for less than a year; their tomb, originally in the church of the Carita, has been demolished. Part of it, a relief showing the Resurrection of Christ, is in the Scuola di San Giovanni Evangelista, attributed to the workshop of Antonio Rizzo.

== Popular culture ==
- Agostino Barbarigo appears as the doge-elect in the video game Assassin's Creed II. Marco's short reign as Doge is ended when Ezio assassinates him. In the Facebook game Assassin's Creed: Project Legacy it is discovered that Agostino became corrupt, and is subsequently killed by the Assassins on 20 September 1501 via a series of poison-coated letters.

== Sources ==
- Lorenzetti, Giulio (1975). Venice and its Lagoon (1982 ed.). Edizioni Lint Trieste. ISBN 978-0510011260.
- Norwich, John J. (1983). A History of Venice. Penguin Books. ISBN 0140066233.
- Romane, Julian (2020). The First and Second Italian Wars 1494-1504: Fearless Knights, Ruthless Princes and the Coming of Gunpowder Armies. Pen and Sword Military. ISBN 978-1526750518.

Political offices
Preceded by Marco Barbarigo	Doge of Venice; 1486–1501	Succeeded by Leonardo Loredan
