= Battle of Cadore =

Battle between Venice and the Holy Roman Empire (1508)

- Part of the War of the League of Cambrai
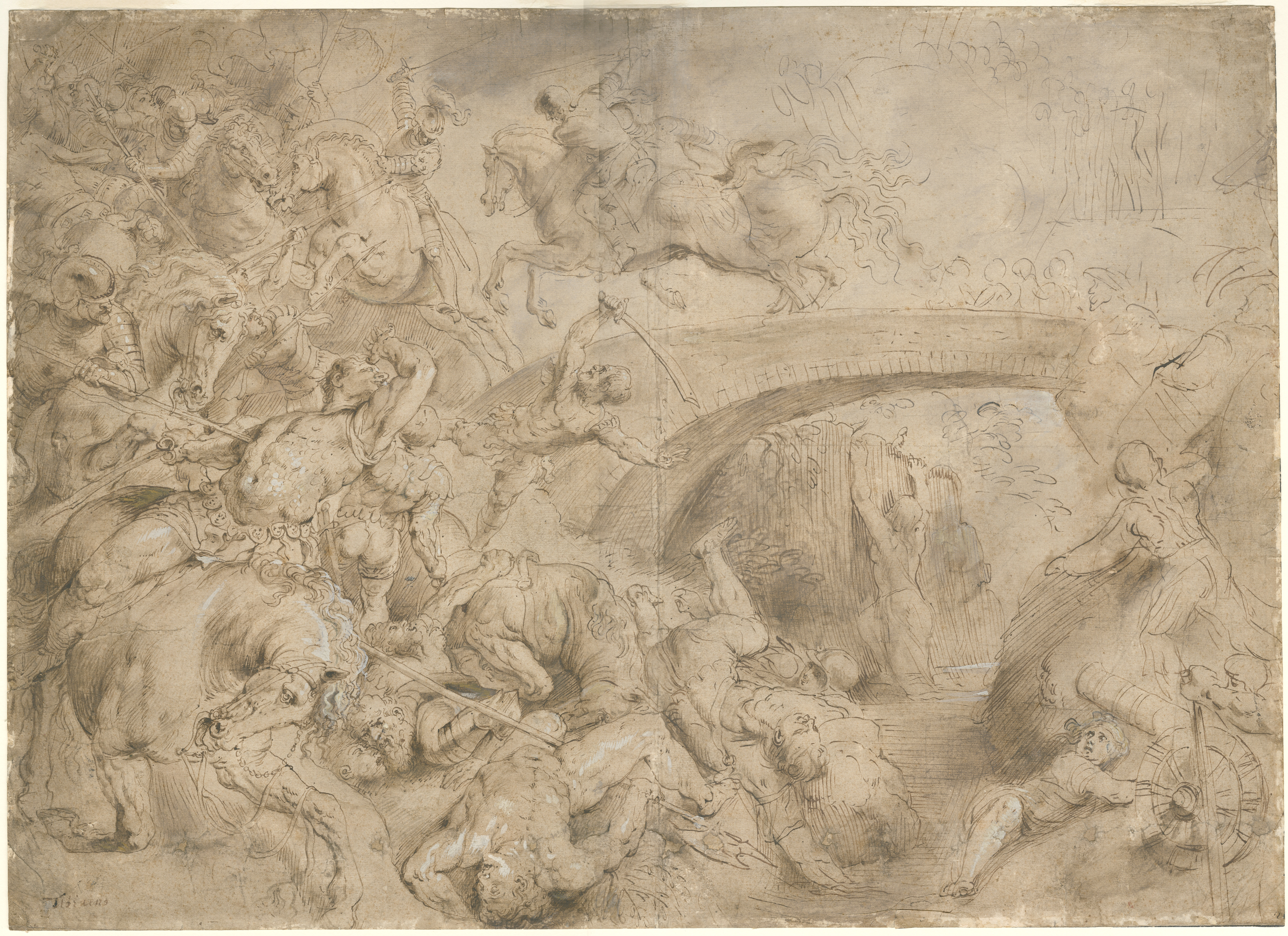
- Sketch made by Rubens from a copy of a painting by Titian depicting the battle
| Date | 2 March 1508 |
| Location | Cadore, northern Veneto, present-day Italy |
| Result | Venetian victory |

Belligerents
| Republic of Venice | Holy Roman Empire |

Commanders and leaders
| Bartolomeo d'Alviano; Pandolfo IV Malatesta; Carlo IV Malatesta †; Rinieri della Sassetta; Camillo Orsini; Pietro del Monte; Babone Naldi; Gianconte Brandolini | Sixt von Trautson †; Johannes Sprengli †; Trips Vailer von Felkircher †; Glauscop von Felkircher † |

Strength
| 3,300 infantry 100 stradioti cavalry 100 heavy cavalry 300 light cavalry 400 mounted crossbowmen 4 falconets | 4,000–6,000 infantry 8 artillery pieces |

Casualties and losses
| Low, including 4 knights | 1,822 killed 500 captured 8 artillery pieces captured |

The battle of Cadore, also known as the battle of Rio Secco or Rusecco, took place near Pieve di Cadore during the opening phase of the War of the League of Cambrai, part of the Italian Wars, on 2 March 1508, opposing the Venetian armies commanded by Bartolomeo d'Alviano and those of the Holy Roman Empire under the leadership of Sixt von Trautson. The battle resulted in a decisive Venetian victory, stopping the Habsburg invasion of Cadore and allowing the Venetians to reconquer all their lost strongholds as well as invade Habsburg-ruled lands in Friuli and the Julian March, besieging Trieste and marching on Istria. This would trigger the creation of the League of Cambrai and the beginning of the War of the League of Cambrai.

== Background ==
=== The coronation of Maximilian I and the Diet of Constance ===
In 1507, Louis XII of France had conquered Genoa and in fact dominated much of northern Italy, having already conquered the Duchy of Milan in 1500. Such preponderance in lands so close to his borders troubled the Holy Roman Emperor Maximilian I of Habsburg, already worried by the French attempts to award the papal seat to Georges d'Amboise, archbishop of Rouen, who proposed to crown the King of the French as emperor. Worried by this, and anxious to stress the role of the Empire, Maximilian I summoned the diet in Constance (April 1507), where in front of the princes and the electors he exposed his concerns about the excessive French power in Italy and the repercussions that such a situation could have in the matters of Germany; he thus managed to persuade the princes to fund an invasion of Italy. Maximilian I proposed himself as defender of the Church, declared Louis XII an enemy of Christianity and announcing his coming to Rome to be crowned Emperor and guarantee the freedom of the holy city. Louis XII immediately denied any aims towards the Empire or St. Peter, staying in Genoa without an army to demonstrate his peaceful intentions, but the diet granted Maximilian I eight thousand knights and twenty-two thousand infantry for six months.

=== Habsburg preparations ===
The first movements of the imperial armies on the borders of Cadore and towards Friuli began between 9 and 10 January 1508, leading Bartolomeo d'Alviano to carry out inspections of the castles of Botestagno and Chiusaforte, reinforcing the fortresses, ordering a moat to be dug in Primolano and ramparts built in Celazzo and Laurone. On 24 January 1508 an imperial messenger reached Verona asking the mayor, Alvise Malipiero, to prepare lodgings for 8,500 horses, since Emperor Maximilian intended to stay there for three days before continuing to Rome. The mayor decided to take his time and relayed Maximilian's request to Venice. The Council of Ten sent a reply stating that the Serenissima would grant him passage as long as the emperor intended to cross its territory "quietly and peacefully". On the other hand, the Venetians had many reasons to consider Maximilian's request nothing more than a pretext for the invasion. They therefore decided to strengthen the Rovereto garrison and to evacuate the town of women, children and other non-combatants, while a garrison of 500 infantrymen under the command of Dionigi Naldi was deployed in Brentonico, and an embassy was sent to Charles II d'Amboise, Grand Master of France and governor of Milan, requesting to send reinforcements under the command of Gian Giacomo Trivulzio. In the following days the hostile intent of the imperials became evident as more and more men gathered around Trento and began to plunder the Lagarina Valley north of Rovereto and the Asiago plateau.

== Invasion of Cadore ==
On 4 February, Pietro Gixi, captain of Cadore, was informed of the arrival around Bruneck of about three hundred German knights and hundreds of infantrymen who, however, did not immediately attack the Venetians as the mountain passes were blocked by the large amount of snow that had fallen in the previous weeks. In the night between 20 and 21 February the German infantry invaded and sacked Ampezzo, besieging the castle of Botestagno, and the next day 4,000 German infantrymen, equipped with grappelle so as not to slip on the ice or sink into the snow, descended from Passo Tre Croci and quickly overran all of Cadore, including the castle of Pieve di Cadore held by Pietro Gixi, who surrendered on the 23rd. By next day only sixty infantrymen under Bortolo Malfato remained to oppose the Habsburg advance at Chiusa di Venas, but they too were forced to retreat first to Pieve and then, after a second battle that lasted four hours and in which they risked being encircled, to the castle of Gardona.

The Venetians, having learned the news, immediately ordered Bartolomeo d'Alviano, on his way to Friuli, to go to Bassano del Grappa together with Giorgio Corner and to prepare a plan to regain control of the region. Andrea Loredan, lieutenant of Udine, sent Geronimo Savorgnan, Francesco Sbrogliavacca, Francesco Beraldo and Antonio Pio to Carnia with their 4,000 infantry to try to lift the siege from the castle of Botestagno. On February 27 the imperial artillery, personally commanded by Maximilian, forced Giovanni Michel and Francesco Zani to hand over the castle after six days of resistance.

== March towards Pieve ==
On 27 February, Alviano reached Belluno, where he consulted with Corner and together they decided to launch an offensive aimed at recovering Cadore. The invasion of that province represented a great threat to the Serenissima, as if the Germans had attacked in Friuli, the Venetians would have been forced to move part of the troops stationed in the Vicenza and Treviso areas, further weakening the defenses and risking the loss of the Belluno and Feltre areas and eventually the invasion of the Treviso plain, which would have resulted in the encirclement of Friuli. From Belluno Alviano set out with an army of about 3,000 men towards the castle of Gardona and on the following day reached the crossroads of Muda. At this point there were two ways to reach Pieve di Cadore. The first, shorter and easier, continued along the Piave Valley along the river as far as Perarolo, where a bridge made it possible to cross the confluence of the Boite. At that point it would be possible to choose whether to take the path that led directly to Pieve, less steep but narrow and exposed to being spotted and ambushed by the enemy, or the one that led to Valle, steeper but less exposed. The second option was to detour to the Muda crossing the Val di Zoldo and then descend into Cadore; this road was difficult because it was long, steep and led to high altitudes, where the snow was even more abundant, yet it made it possible to avoid being sighted by the enemy. Alviano chose the latter and sent envoys to Savorgnan, informing him of the details of the offensive, which would be launched on the morning of March 2. His troops, once they reached Forno di Zoldo, would have marched along the Cibiana Pass descending to Venas and then moving towards Pieve, and at the same time Savorgnan's men would have had to go from Forni di Sopra to the Mauria Pass and then descend to Lorenzago, capture Treponti and go up the Val d'Ansiei up to Passo Tre Croci and Misurina Pass. Once the Val d'Ansiei was secured, the men of Savorgnan would have had to descend to Domegge, besieging Pieve from the east. In this way the Venetians would have cut off all supply and escape routes for the Germans, forcing the latter to fight them or starve. On the same day part of the Germans went up towards Domegge but were intercepted by Beraldo's stradioti and forced to fall back to Pieve, where they entrenched themselves with palisades and wooden shelters.

== Battle of the Rio Secco ==
On 29 February, Alviano reached the Val di Zoldo with his army exhausted by the long march, and was greeted by a storm that prevented him from proceeding, therefore he stopped to clear the snow as much as possible. In the evening the Malatesta troops joined the rest of the army. On 1 March the army set off again and after having crossed the Cibiana Pass and passed the Boite at the end of the day it reached Venas, three miles from Pieve, where it left a garrison to block the escape of the enemies. In order to discipline his soldiers, Alviano ordered the commanders to keep them close to their flag, forbade anyone from retreating under penalty of being treated as an enemy, and promised rewards to those who would kill deserters. He forbade taking prisoners and booty before the battle was over, threatening to hang anyone who disobeyed. Finally, he promised the stradioti a ducat for each enemy head and a provision for life in case of victory as well as full compensation for the horse to those who had lost it in the battle. The command of the infantry was then entrusted to Pietro dal Monte, that of the cavalry to Giacomo Secco, the crossbowmen to Franco dal Borgo and the stradioti to Repossi Busicchio. The vanguard consisted of 400 infantry led by Pietro del Monte, 200 to 300 infantry under Rinieri della Sassetta and 54 infantrymen led by Bortolo Malfato and was deployed in the plain between the town of Nogaré and the slopes of Monte Zucco. The right wing consisted of Carlino Naldi's 400 infantrymen, Babone Naldi's 200 infantrymen and the condotta of Giovan Francesco Gambara. The left wing was composed of the 600 infantrymen under Lattanzio da Bergamo. In a battalion placed to the left of the infantry there were about 100 heavy knights and 300 cavalrymen led by Giacomo Secco. The approximately 70-100 mounted crossbowmen under the command of Franco dal Borgo would target the right side of the enemy infantry, while those of the Aviano (led by Pietro Querini) and those of the Malatesta would target the left side. In front of the enemy right wing the 100 stradioti infantry led by Repossi Busicchio were deployed, alongside him the men of Count Ruggero Zofa and behind it the 200 stradioti crossbowmen of Teodoro Manes and Costantino Paleologo. The artillery would have been deployed to the right of the Venetian army. There remained about 1,400 reserve men made up of the broken lances of Alviano and Pandolfo IV Malatesta.

From Venas the Venetians continued towards Valle, which they reached around 10 am on 2 March. D'Alviano sent in advance a group of stradioti who, however, violating the general's recommendations, set fire to some houses of Tai inside which some German infantrymen were housed. This was the spark that forced the Venetian general to start a battle that lasted less than an hour and took place near the snow-covered banks of the Rio Secco, whose whiteness was stained by the shed blood. The German infantrymen, about four thousand, knowing they were risking the encirclement, lined up in a square with the baggage and the women in the middle, then quickly marched against the Venetians with the intention of breaking through the ranks and opening up an escape route. Alviano, riding a nag in the center of the Venetian array, ordered the wings, made up of crossbowmen, cavalrymen and stradioti, to attack the flanks of the enemy to disturb it and slow it down while he reorganized the army, as part of the cavalry had not yet arrived. Rinieri della Sassetta, together with a dozen cavalrymen from Cardillo, Busicchio's stradioti and Franco dal Borgo's crossbowmen, attacked the enemy artillery on three sides and managed to capture it. On the right, the infantrymen of Naldi and Gambara, assisted by the Querini crossbowmen and the artillery, kept the left flank of the Germans engaged. During the clashes the commander Sixt von Trautson engaged in a duel with Rinieri della Sassetta, who carried the banner of the Serenissima, managing to wound him with a blow to the face. Rinieri responded by mortally wounding him in the neck with his pike and throwing him from the saddle.

The death of their commander caused the advance of the German infantrymen to lose momentum. At that point d'Alviano counterattacked with the infantry arranged as follows: in the center was the infantry of the general himself, together with those of Carlo Malatesta and Pietro dal Monte; on the right Babone and Carlino Naldi, and farther out towards Monte, Rinieri della Sassetta; on the left instead there was the condotta of Lattanzio da Bergamo. The Venetian infantry was followed by the heavy cavalry and the cavalrymen of Pandolfo Malatesta and Giacomo Secco. The Venetians managed to break through the German square, whose infantry were mostly killed near the banks of the Rio Secco despite begging for mercy. Two hours after the end of the battle, the men from Savorgnan arrived in Pieve, having managed to secure Treponti, the Val d'Ansiei and the passes. The Venetians lost only four heavy horsemen, sixteen horses and a small number of foot soldiers. The Germans lost 1,688 men killed and another 500 surrendered at the end of the battle and were spared and later released under the payment of a ransom; the Venetians also captured eight enemy artillery pieces. The fugitives tried to rejoin the bulk of the imperial army by dispersing and crossing the mountain passes, but about a hundred of them were killed by the stradioti in Val di Zoldo, others drowned in the Piave, and others still froze to death.

== Assault on the Castle of Pieve ==
The only remaining Germans were the approximately seventy men who guarded the castle of Pieve, perched on a rocky relief. On the morning of March 3, d'Alviano had four falconets driven to the top of a hill in front of the fortress and began shooting without causing significant damage, given the small caliber of the guns. Believing that it would not be enough to tear down the fortress, he sent a messenger to Venice to ask for larger caliber pieces, and in the meantime he tried to induce the garrison to surrender by promising that their lives would be spared in exchange. The Germans replied they would surrender the castle within three days, perhaps hoping for an unlikely rescue from their comrades. Towards and at 1 pm on 4 March the Venetians, tired of waiting and running out of food, decided to attack the castle from two sides: the front, defended by two ravelins, would be attacked by Alviano and Pietro dal Monte, the rear by Pandolfo and Carlo Malatesta, Lattanzio da Bergamo, Giovanni Battista Mio, Piero Querini, Piero Corso and Cardillo. He then had a group of hand gunners stationed on a knoll with the task of covering the advance of the infantry by targeting the enemies who would come out of the shelters on the walls.

The Germans defended themselves bravely causing some losses to the assailants, including that of Carlo IV Malatesta, hit by a stone that smashed his helmet. Some Venetian infantrymen including Cola Moro, Girolamo Granchio, Turchetto da Lodi, Alfonso da Siena and Morgante Pagano still managed to climb the walls of one of the ravelins, killing the guards and then lowering the drawbridge. At that point Alviano entered, flanked by ten knights and the infantry of Pietro dal Monte and Lattanzio da Bergamo. The door of the second ravelin, reinforced by the enemies with beams and earth, was broken with a hatchet and a pickaxe and among the first to enter it were Costantino Paleologo and Sertorio da Collalto. The door to the tower was then broken open and burned while the Germans inside continued to throw stones from the machicolations. When the door was forced, the surviving Germans surrendered. The assault had lasted three hours and the castle garrison had lost thirty-four men killed; many of the survivors were wounded. The survivors were stripped of their belongings and then released. In the castle the winners found about 1,500 ducats, which were distributed to the soldiers by order of the Serenissima, as well as many of the goods stolen from the houses of Cadore and Valle d'Ampezzo.

== Consequences ==
The Venetian victory ensured great fame, honor and money for Bartolomeo d'Alviano, who on 4 March was appointed captain general of the Venetian infantry and cavalry, with his pay increased from 15,000 to 30,000 ducats a year to which a bonus of 1,000 ducats was added along with the possibility of keeping captured guns. Following the death of Filippo Albanese in Ravenna, the 400 cavalrymen of his company were attached to that of Alviano, who therefore held command over a condotta of 1,000 cavalrymen. On 5 March Alviano left Cadore at the head of 5,000 men; on 6 March superintendent Giorgio Corner appointed Giovanni Foscarini as temporary superintendent of Cadore, the condottieri Piero Corso and Girolamo Granchio as new castellans of Pieve and left the troops of Bortolo Malfato and Girolamo Barisello as garrison; he also placed garrisons at Chiusa Venas and at Treponti, after which he left the valley at the head of 600 cavalrymen headed for Friuli, where the imperial soldiers were gathering in view of a new offensive. The 4,000 men who came from Carnia with Savorgnan also withdrew. After the siege, the Venetian soldiers were forced to eat only bread, wine and apples for a few days as there was nothing left in the valley. However, on 8 March they captured a convoy of four wagons full of bread and wheat pulled by twenty horses and protected by some German soldiers who had not received the news of the defeat of the Rio Secco and were trying to reach their companions in Pieve.

In the following months Alviano advanced into Habsburg-held lands in Friuli and the Julian March and conquered Pordenone (in May 1508), Gorizia, Trieste, Pisino, Fiume and Postojna, being then granted the lordship of Pordenone and admission to the Maggior Consiglio. Maximilian I had to renounce any claim not only over the lost lands but even on the claims of coronation in Rome, and on 6 June 1508 he signed an armistice accepting the humiliating conditions imposed by the Venetians. Venice, which had already become the most powerful of the Italian states following the division of the Duchy of Romagna, further expanded its borders, reaching the apex of its terrestrial expansion and causing the discontent of many, first of all Pope Julius II, who on 10 December 1508 united France, the Holy Roman Empire, Spain, Ferrara, Mantua and the Duchy of Savoy in the League of Cambrai in an anti-Venetian function; in the spring of 1509, the battle of Agnadello marked the definitive halt to the Venetian domination in northern Italy to the advantage of the Kingdom of France.

The battle was depicted in a painting by Titian (who hailed from Pieve di Cadore) in the Palazzo Ducale in Venice, destroyed by a fire in 1577.
