= Boite (river) =

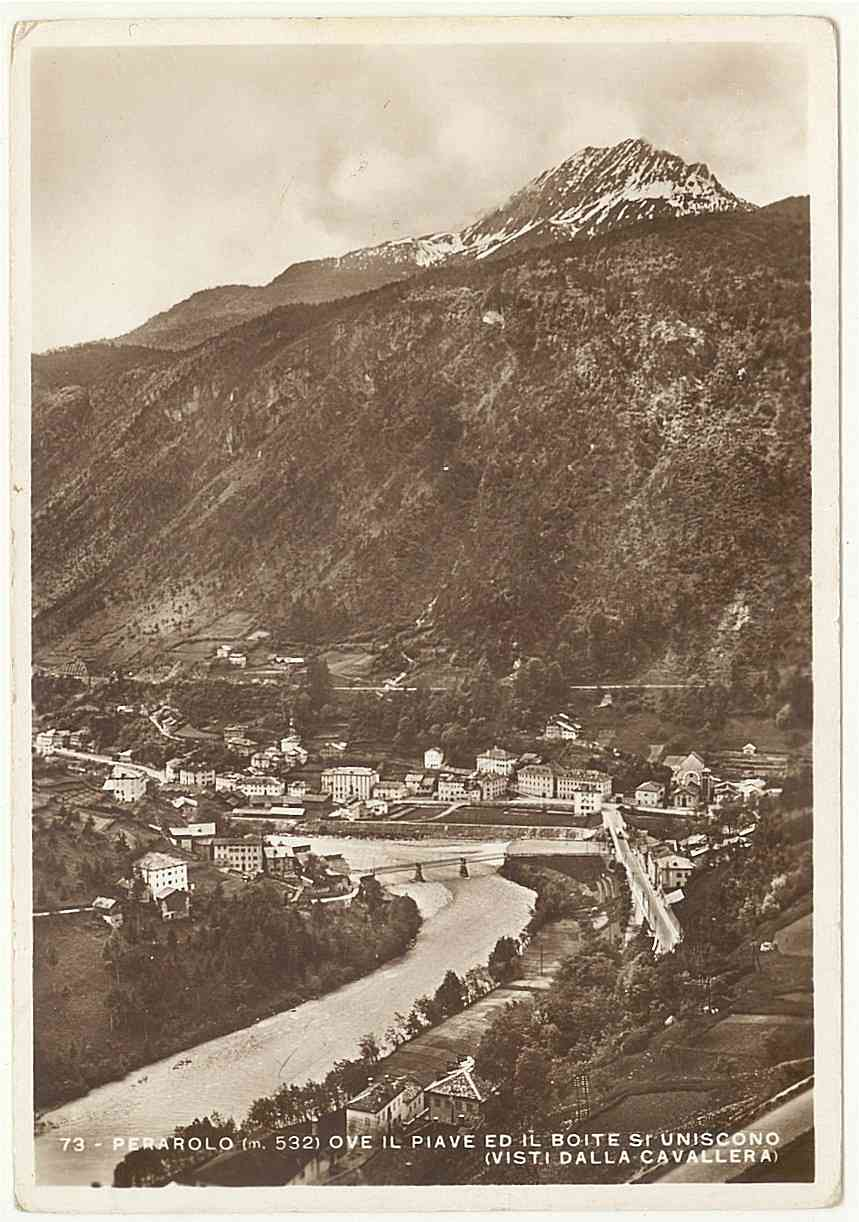
- The river in 1941

Location
- Country: Italy

Physical characteristics
- Mouth: Piave
  - coordinates: 46°23′47″N 12°21′26″E

Basin features
- Progression: Piave→ Adriatic Sea

The Boite (Cadorino dialect, Guóite) is a river of the Province of Belluno, Veneto region, northern Italy. Passing through the town of Cortina d'Ampezzo, it joins the Piave at Perarolo di Cadore. The principal valley, that of the Piave, runs parallel to the mountain chain which separates the province of Belluno from the basin of the Adige. The secondary valleys, which complete the river basin, are, in descending order and on the right bank, those of Visdende, Comelico Superiore, Auronzo, Boite and Zoldo, traversed, respectively, by the Silvella, or first branch of the Piave, the Padola, Ansiei, Boite, and Mae, which all flow into the main river in a rectangular direction.

== Geography ==
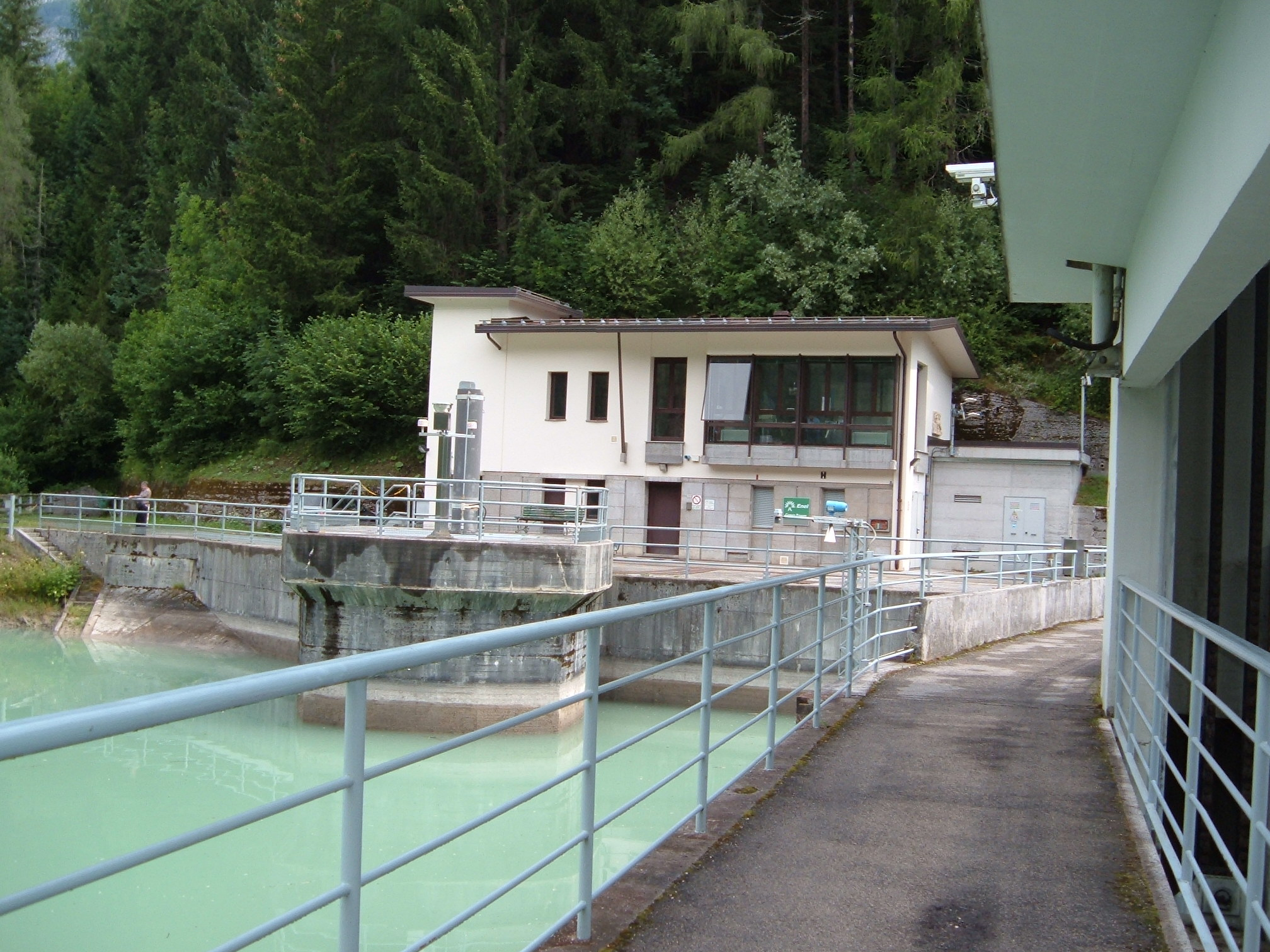
Vodo di Cadore reservoir

The Boite, a tributary of the Piave, flows through the Dolomites in a north–south direction, passing through the Valle del Boite and town of Cortina d'Ampezzo. It also passes through the comunes of San Vito di Cadore, Borca di Cadore, Vodo di Cadore and Valle di Cadore. The river Boite flows for 45.07 kilometres (28.01 mi), and has a basin area of 395.9 square kilometres (152.9 sq mi). During its course, it receives numerous streams and mountain rivers, the largest of which is the stream from Monte Rite at Cibiana di Cadore. Its tributaries are, Fanes, Costeana, Felizon, Ursuline, Assola, Rite, Rudan, Vallesina Over the course of the Boite are also the reservoirs of Vodo and Valle di Cadore. Near Cortina, it is encircled by mountain ranges of Cristallo, Sorapiss, and Tofane, whose peaks are Tofana di Mezzo (3,244 m), Tofana di Dentro (3,238m), and Tofana di Rozes (3,225 m).

== Geology ==
The Boite and Piave drainage system belongs to the complex Dolomite Alps geology sequence made up of sedimentary rocks intruded with pyroclastic. These are found to overlay the thrust zones of igneous and meta sedimentary late Paleozoic rocks. Local intrusion of many types of shallow Mesozoic and tertiary rocks are also noted. The high rise domes of the mountains, primarily belong to the Mesozoic age and basically consist of dolomite with exposures of limestone, marlstone, claystone, siltstone, sandstone, tuff and conglomerates.

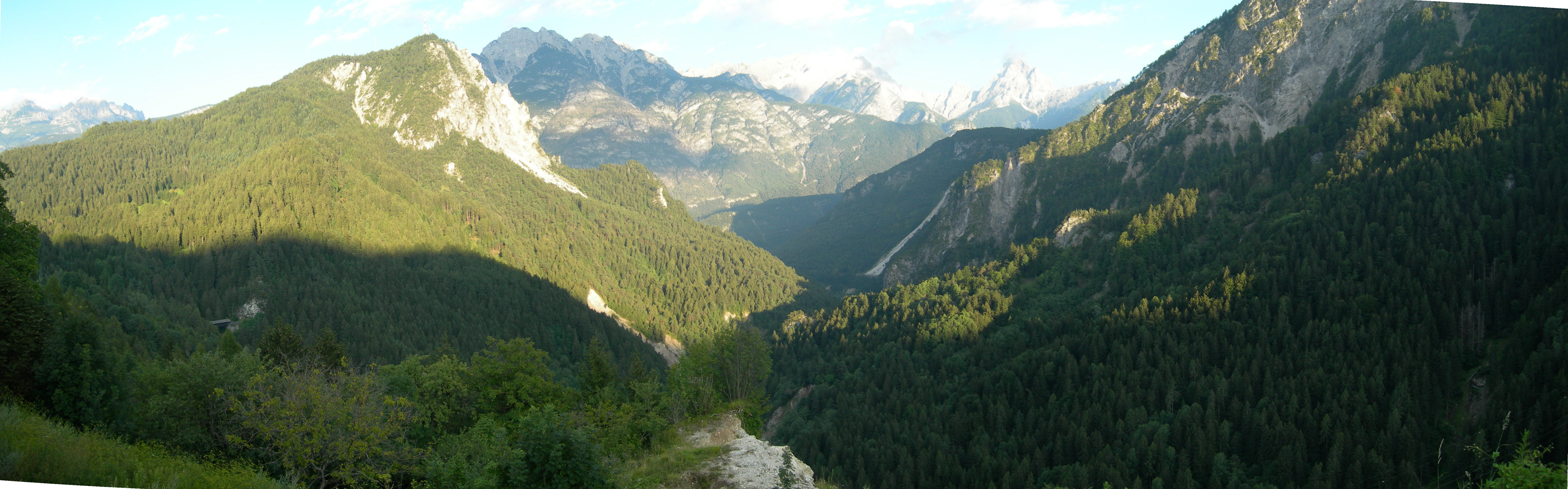
Panorama

== Landmarks ==
The Boite river valley has eight distinct ski areas which are located in the lower-altitude snowfields and which are approached by cable cars. Cortina, as Italy's premier ski resort, has over 50 cable cars and lifts in this river valley. Castello di Botestagno was a medieval fort perched on a rock in the valley overlooking the Boite; little remains of it today. An Ossuary near Cortina has the skeletal remains of 10,000 soldiers killed during World War I. The Piave-Boite-Mae-Vaiont is an important water resources development scheme in the valley with the Pieve di Cadore reservoir as the head reservoir.

The location shooting for the Hollywood film A Farewell to Arms (1957) was done in this river valley.

== Bibliography ==
- Arribas, José; Critelli, Salvatore; Johnsson, Mark J. (1 January 2007). Sedimentary Provenance and Petrogenesis: Perspectives from Petrography and Geochemistry. Geological Society of America. ISBN 978-0-8137-2420-1.
- Economic Commission for Asia and the Far East (1962). Water Resources Series. United Nations.
- Frommer's (24 May 2012). AARP Italy 2012. John Wiley & Sons. ISBN 978-1-118-25836-1.
- Great Britain. Foreign Office (1888). Diplomatic and Consular Reports. Miscellaneous Series.
- Picard, M. Dane (6 December 2012). Mountains and Minerals/Rivers and Rocks: A Geologist's Notes from the Field. Springer Science & Business Media. ISBN 978-1-4684-6444-3.
- Matthews, John A. (1997). Rapid Mass Movement as a Source of Climatic Evidence for the Holocene. G. Fischer. ISBN 978-3-437-25388-1.
