= Cibiana Pass =

Mountain pass in the Dolomites

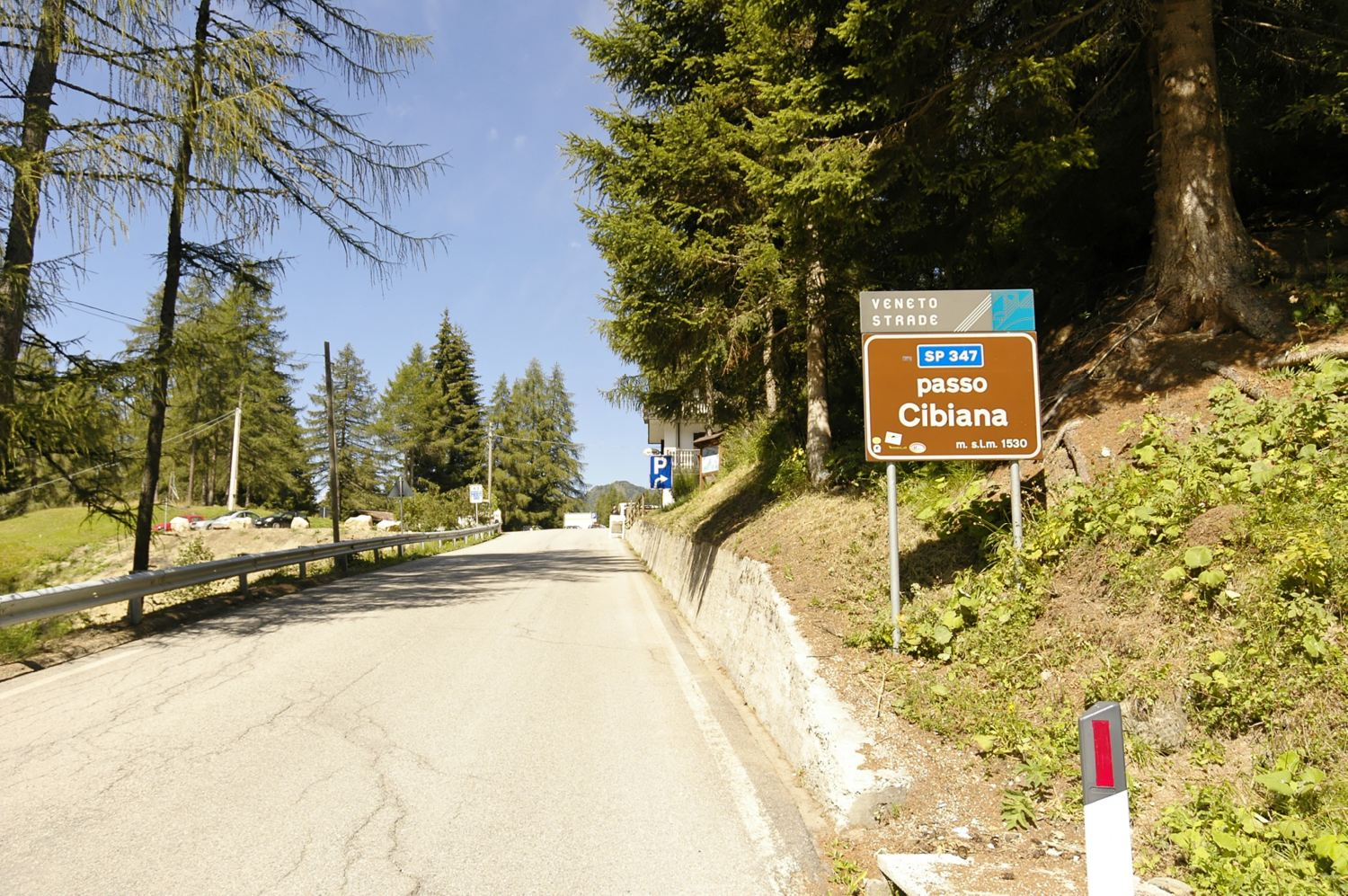

- Location within Alps
- Elevation: 1,530 m (5,020 ft)
- Traversed by: SP347

Location
- Location: Belluno, Italy
- Range: Dolomites
- Coordinates: 46°22′27″N 12°15′32″E

The Cibiana Pass (Italian: Passo Cibiana) (1,530 m / 5,020 ft) is a high mountain pass in the southern Dolomites in the Province of Belluno in Italy. It connects Val Boise in the east with Val di Zoldo in the west, forming a natural saddle between Col Alto (2,145 m) to the northwest and Sassolungo di Cibiana (2,413 m) to the southeast.

== Geography and Road ==
The pass road is approximately 20.7 kilometers long, running from Forno di Zoldo (820 m) in the west to Venas di Cadore (860 m) in the east. From Forno di Zoldo, the western ascent is 10.34 km long with an elevation gain of 724 meters, averaging a 7% gradient. The eastern approach from Venas di Cadore spans 9.8 km with an elevation gain of 762 meters and an average gradient of 7.8%. The steepest sections reach 13-15% as the road climbs through switchbacks near Villanova.

To the north lie Monte Pelmo (3,168 m) and Monte Rite (2,181 m), which can be reached from the pass via an old military road built during World War I.

== History ==
=== World War I ===
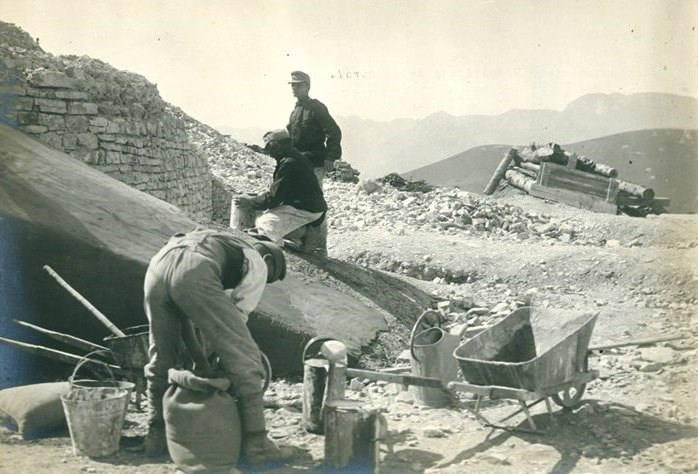
Austrian soldiers building concrete fortifications during WWI

During World War I, the Cibiana Pass gained strategic military importance on the Italian Front. The Italian Army constructed Fort Monte Rite on the summit of Monte Rite between 1911 and 1915 as part of the Cadore-Maè fortification system. Built at an elevation of 2,183 meters, the fort was designed to control the valleys of Zoldo, Cortina d'Ampezzo, and strategic approaches through the Dolomites. The installation was equipped with four 70mm cannons, four 75A guns, and four 149G artillery pieces, with additional 149A pieces in turrets planned but not completed before the outbreak of war.

The access road to Monte Rite was constructed from Venas, following lengthy discussions with the Municipality of Cibiana, which ceded the necessary council land for the construction by virtue of an agreement entered into with the Army on 15 December 1911. However, significant delays meant the fort was not fully operational when war began in 1914, with the Cozzene barracks and numerous mule tracks remaining incomplete.

After the Italian defeat at Caporetto in October 1917, the fort was abandoned by its garrison. Austrian forces conducted reconnaissance surveys on 4 November 1917, confirming the fort was still functional but being evacuated. The Austrians removed substantial munitions and equipment before extensively damaging the fortifications in October 1918. Wartime fortifications and structures from this era remain visible on Monte Rite today.

== Village of Cibiana di Cadore ==
The pass takes its name from the nearby village of Cibiana di Cadore, a small mountain settlement of approximately 450 inhabitants situated at 985 meters elevation. Founded over a thousand years ago, Cibiana is known as the "Village of Murals" or "the village that paints its own history." Beginning in 1980, through an initiative by Osvaldo Da Col and Ludovico Calabrò, the village transformed itself into an open-air art gallery to halt population decline and promote local tourism.

More than 50 murals now decorate the facades of traditional houses throughout Cibiana's three districts (Masarié, Pianezze, and Cibiana di Sotto), created by Italian and international artists from countries including Japan and Russia. The paintings depict local history, traditional crafts (including blacksmiths, dairymen, millers, and the village's historic key-making industry), and scenes of daily life in the Dolomites. New murals continue to be added annually. The village also features historic cottages dating from the 16th, 17th, and 18th centuries along cobbled streets.

== Messner Mountain Museum ==
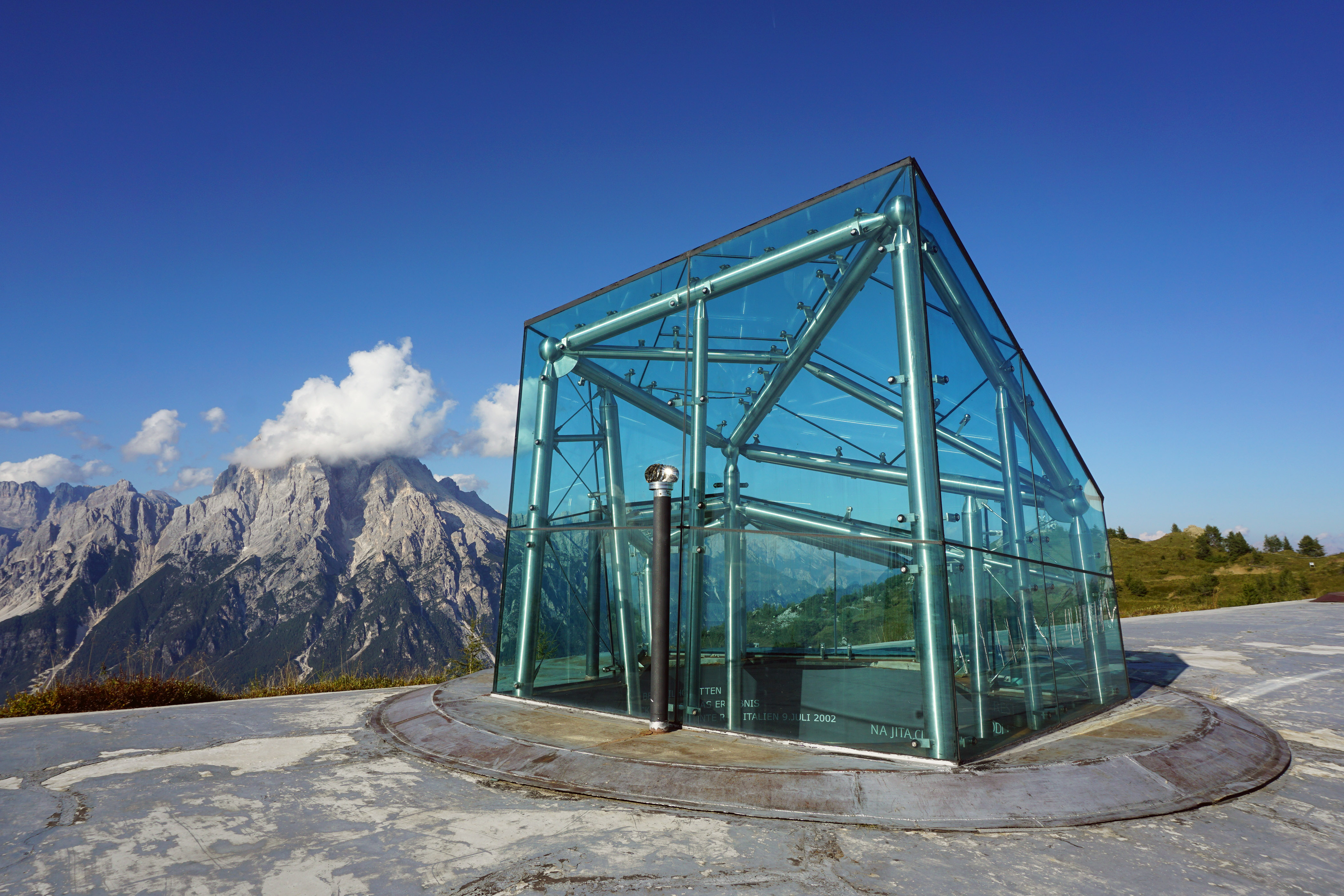
Messner Mountain Museum Dolomites in Monte Rite.

In 2002, Italian mountaineer Reinhold Messner opened the MMM Dolomites (Messner Mountain Museum Dolomites) in the restored Fort Monte Rite, sometimes called the "Museum in the Clouds." The museum is dedicated to the history of exploration and mountaineering in the Dolomites, featuring relics, artworks, fossils, photographs, and academic studies examining the origins and development of rock climbing in the region. The museum sits at 2,181 meters altitude and offers panoramic views of the surrounding peaks including Monte Pelmo, Monte Antelao, and Sorapis.

The facility can be reached from Passo Cibiana via shuttle bus (approximately 20 minutes) or on foot via two routes: an easy 7-kilometer walk on the military road (approximately 2 hours) or the CAI path n. 479 Col de Orlando, which rejoins the military road at Forcella Dèona (1.5 hours). The museum is open from June to September.

== Cycling ==
Cibiana Pass has been featured as a climb in the Giro d'Italia cycling race. In the 2023 Giro d'Italia, the pass appeared in Stage 18, where riders climbed the Forcella Cibiana (9.6 km at 8% gradient) before descending into Val di Zoldo. The pass is popular with cycling enthusiasts for its scenic panoramas and challenging gradients.

== See also ==
- List of highest paved roads in Europe
- List of mountain passes
