= Cibiana di Cadore =

- Comune
- Comune di Cibiana di Cadore
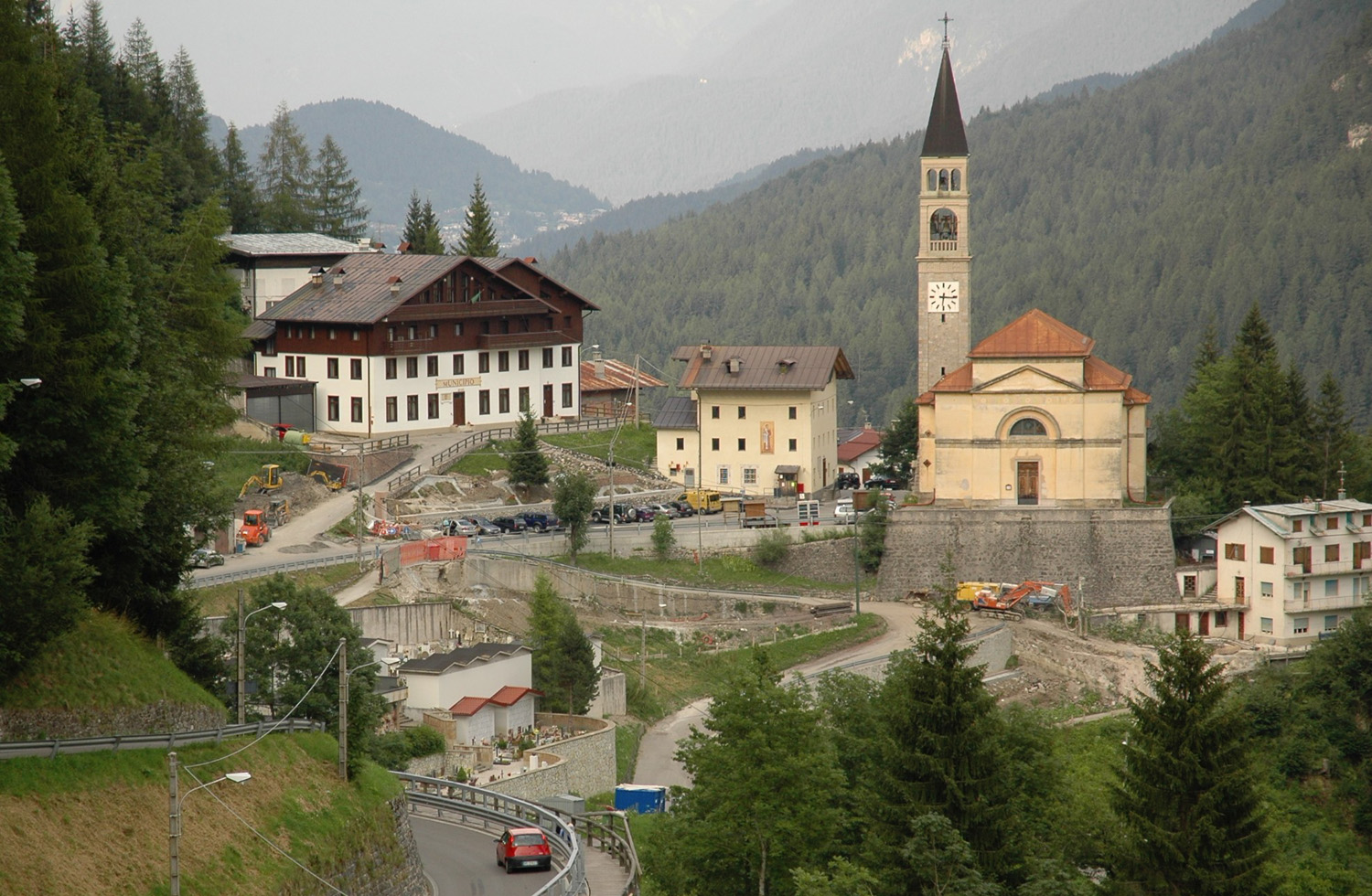

- Location within Italy Location within Veneto
- Coordinates: 46°23′N 12°17′E
- Country: Italy
- Region: Veneto
- Province: Belluno (BL)
- Frazioni: Boroughs: Masarié, Cibiana di Sotto, Pianezze, Strassei, Sù Gesia, Le Nove, Col, Pian Gran, Dèona

Government
  - Mayor: Mattia Gosetti

Area
  - Total: 21.7 km^{2} (8.4 sq mi)
- Elevation: 1,025 m (3,363 ft)

Population (Dec. 2004)
  - Total: 454
  - Density: 20.9/km^{2} (54.2/sq mi)
- Demonym: Cibianesi or Cibianotti
- Time zone: UTC+1 (CET)
  - Summer (DST): UTC+2 (CEST)
- Postal code: 32040
- Dialing code: 0435
- Website: Official website

Cibiana di Cadore is a comune (municipality) in the province of Belluno in the Italian region of Veneto, located about 110 kilometres (68 mi) north of Venice and about 30 kilometres (19 mi) north of Belluno. As of 31 December 2004, it had a population of 454 and an area of 21.7 square kilometres (8.4 mi^{2}).

The municipality of Cibiana di Cadore contains the frazioni (subdivisions, mainly villages and hamlets) Borgate: Masarié, Cibiana di Sotto, Pianezze, Strassei, Sù Gesia, Le Nove, Col, Pian Gran, and Dèona.

Cibiana di Cadore borders the following municipalities: Forno di Zoldo, Ospitale di Cadore, Valle di Cadore, Vodo di Cadore.

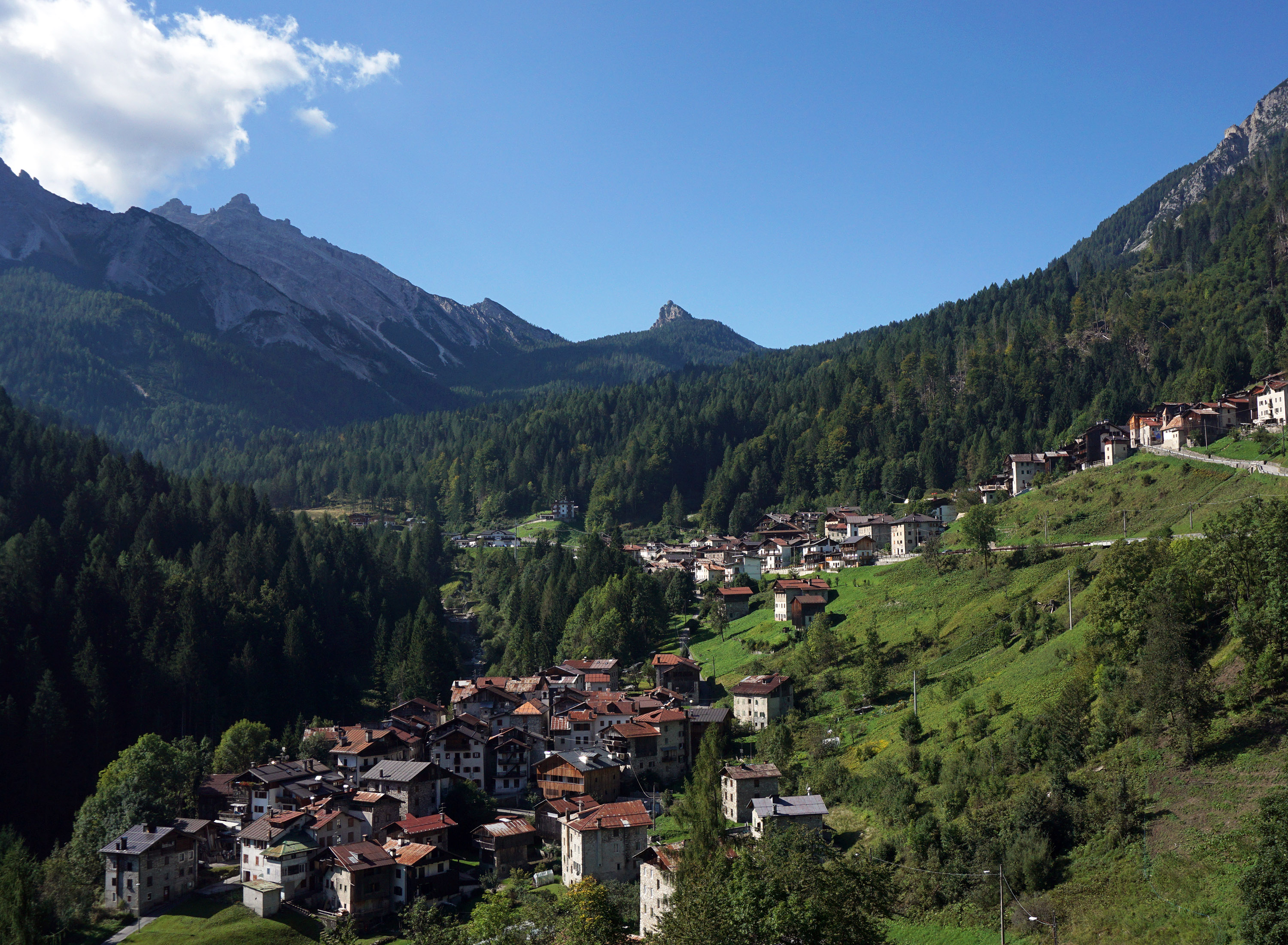
Cibiana di Cadore

== Demographic evolution ==
Historical population

Year	Pop.	±%
1861	?	—
1871	1,328	—
1881	1,517	+14.2%
1901	1,636	+7.8%
1911	1,893	+15.7%

Year	Pop.	±%
1921	2,172	+14.7%
1931	1,588	−26.9%
1936	1,260	−20.7%
1951	1,272	+1.0%
1961	1,054	−17.1%

Year	Pop.	±%
1971	917	−13.0%
1981	740	−19.3%
1991	645	−12.8%
2001	483	−25.1%

Source: Data from ISTAT
