= Barovier & Toso =

Glassmaking company of Venice, Italy

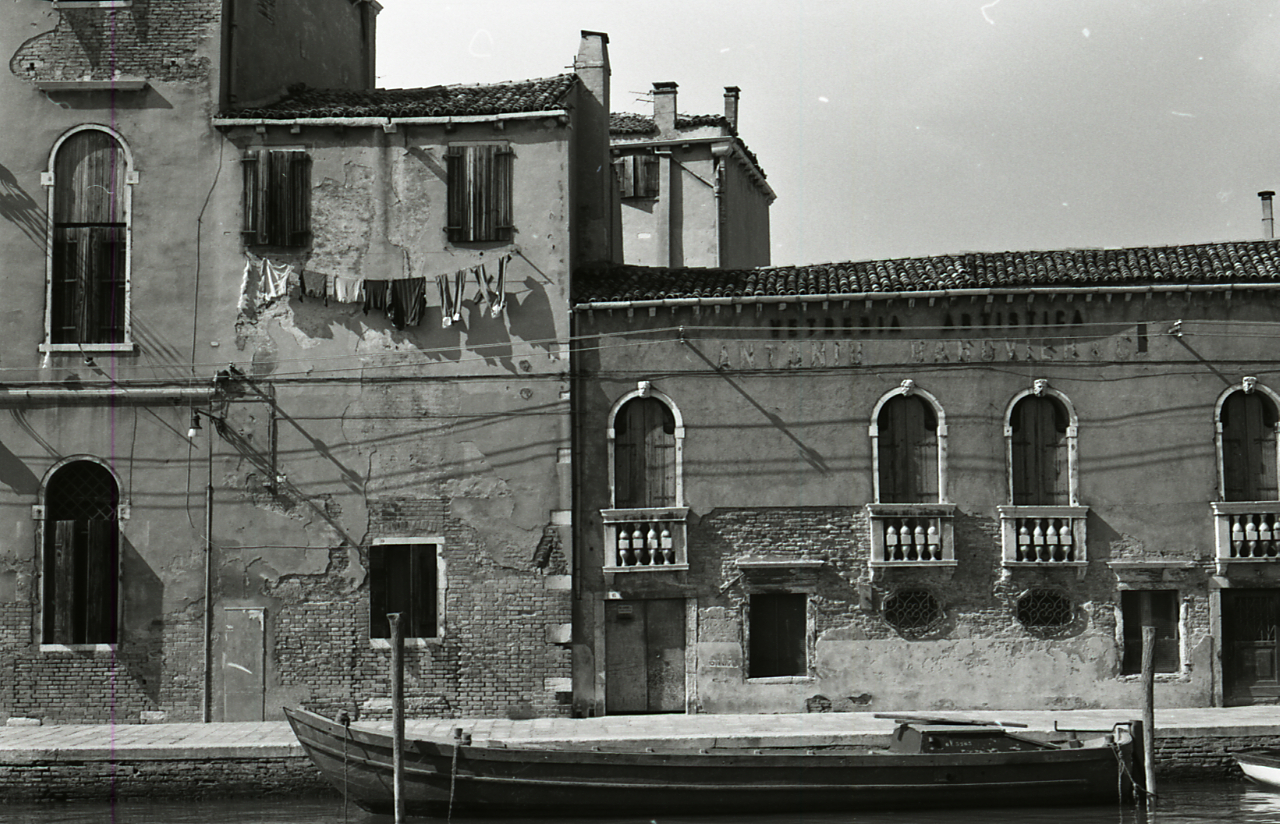
- Barovier, Murano, Venice (right). Photo by Paolo Monti, 1968.
- Type: Private
- Industry: Manufacturing
- Founded: Italy
- Headquarters: Murano, Italy
- Website: https://barovier.com

Barovier&Toso is an Italian company that specialises in high quality handcrafted Murano glass lighting and interior design. In 2015, Rinaldo Invernizzi acquired a 95% stake in the company through his holding Oikia 3, making him the majority shareholder of one of the oldest family businesses in the world. In 2017, Rinaldo Invernizzi became president of Barovier&Toso and oversaw the opening of Palazzo Barovier&Toso in the following year, housing additional showrooms nearby the company's historic headquarters in Murano. In 2024, Andrea Signoroni was appointed as the company's CEO. The appointment of Luca Nichetto as the company's artistic director followed in 2025.

== History ==
The earliest documented evidence of the Barovier family in Murano dates to 1324, when Iacobellus Beroier de Muriano (Iacobello Barovier of Murano), born around 1295, is mentioned in legal documents preserved in the State Archives of Venice. Iacobello may be connected to the Barovier family recorded at Castelfranco in the Treviso area from 1279 and banished from that city after a political conspiracy in 1318. The first reference to the family's profession survives in a document from 1343, where Iacobello's son Antonio is qualified as a glassmaker (phyolarius), confirming their activity in glass production. The Toso family is similarly documented as glassmakers in Murano from at least 1407, when Bartolomeo 'Tonso' appears in local records as one of the earliest certain representatives of the dynasty. In the fifteenth century, Angelo Barovier rose to fame for his scientific experiments in improving the transparency of glass and his development of crystalline glasswork. His daughter Marietta Barovier was celebrated for the rosette bead, multi-layered star-patterned glass pearls exported across Africa and the Americas. The so-called 'Barovier Cup' at the Glass Museum in Murano, dated to the 1470s–1480s, cannot be attributed to Angelo Barovier, who died in 1460 and was a master glassmaker and technical innovator rather than a glass painter or enameller, though it represents Murano glassmaking at its most sophiscted level.

=== 20th century ===
In 1936, Vetreria Artistica Barovier merged with Ferro Toso, forming Ferro Toso Barovier Vetrerie Artistiche Riunite S.A., specializing in crystalline glass, mother-of-pearl glass, and gold-free cornelian red glass. In 1939 the company was renamed Barovier Toso & Co., before assuming its current name Barovier&Toso in 1942.

Ercole Barovier left a major impact in his family's history through his exceptional artistic talent and a career spanning over 50 years. "After studying medicine and working as a radio operator during World War One he joined the family firm in 1920 when he and his brother Nicolo took over the management from their father Benvenuto. From 1927 Ercole was the main designer and from 1934, when Nicolo left the company, (he was) also the sole owner." While Barovier did not have formal training as a glassblower, his artistic designs produced objets d'art that have become the most critically acclaimed in the history of Ercole - Barovier. In 1930 he produced his award-winning “Primavera” series. "The Primavera series ... is distinguished by a milky white 'craquelé' glass with the addition of black or blue pasta vitrea trim ("opaque colored glass whose consistency is made to appear like ceramic") and decoration. There was a very limited production of this series because it was a result of a glass mixture obtained accidentally so it could never be replicated." One example of this series, a Primavera Pigeon, was sold at auction for GBP 275,000 (approximately $360,000 USD, not inclusive of the buyer’s premium) on October 16, 2019.

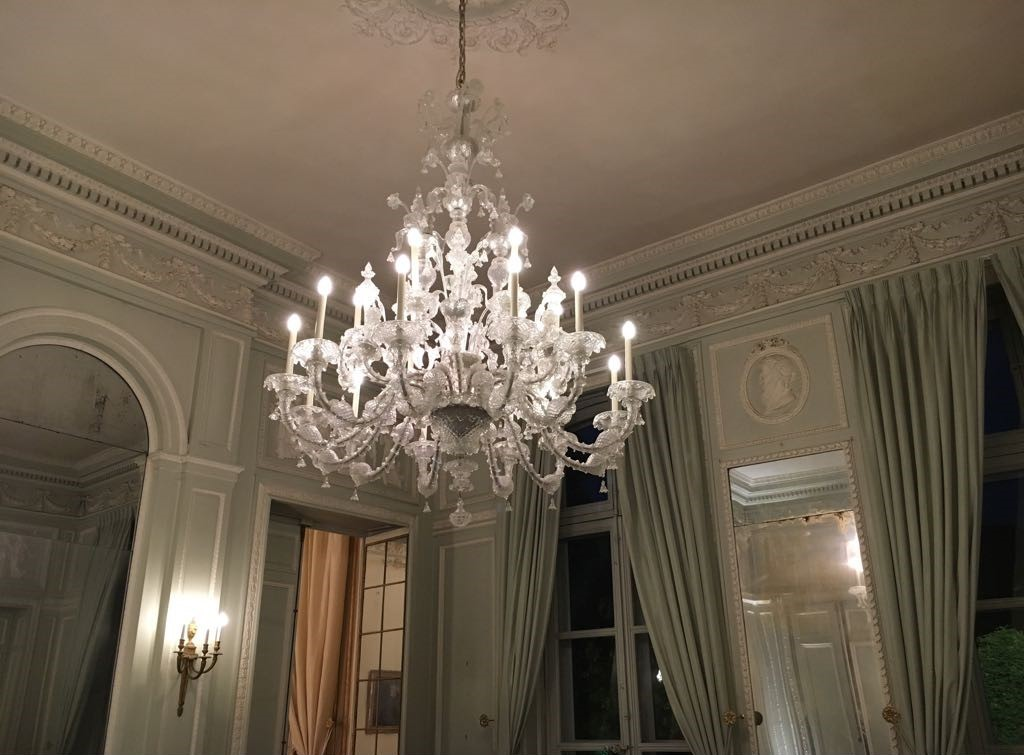
The chandelier in the dining room of the Hôtel de Besenval, purchased from Barovier & Toso in 1962 by the Swiss Confederation.

Ercole Barovier continued to produce innovative designs of which the “Lenti” vase series is an example. “Lenti” was produced in 1940. This vase was a dual ‘layer’ vase. This type of vase is sometimes referred to as 'cased'. “Cased glass combines glass layers of contrasting color, or a colored layer blown with a clear one. The interior layer is, in effect, encased in the exterior … Looking into the interior of a cased object will reveal a color different than that of the exterior. One of the first known examples of cased glass, the Portland Vase, dates from the reign of Roman emperor Caesar Augustus.” The first outer layer of the Lenti vase consisted of a series of clear thick convex semi-globular forms in which small thin leaves of pure gold are suspended. The inner thin layer of the vase was made of a brightly colored glass. The clear outer portion of the vase reflects the color of the inner vase while creating an optical illusion (due to the magnification effect of the convex shaped glass) of large ‘moving’ gold leaves. This series was produced in colors that vary and include cerulean blue, aqua blue, emerald green, lime green and crimson red.

Under the direction, of Ercole Barovier, the company won awards during the 1940s and 1950s for innovations in the murrine technique. Murrine technique begins with the layering of colored liquid glass, heated to 1500-1700F or above, which is then stretched into long rods called canes. When cooled, these canes are then sliced in cross-sections, which reveals the layered pattern. A 9 1/2-inch high vase created by the Murrine technique by Ercole Barovier and described as a “1930, clear murrines (vase) edged in red with aventurine” was offered at auction on May 20, 2014. "Prior to sale estimates from the auction house gave an anticipated value of $ 15,000 - 20,000 (USD). The final bid was $ 317,000 (USD) not inclusive of the buyer’s premium. Buyer’s premium at fine art auctions houses will generally add an additional 20-25% (of the final winning bid amount) to the final total price.

== Notable customers ==
- The chandelier in the dining room of the Hôtel de Besenval, the Embassy of the Swiss Confederation in France, was purchased from Barovier&Toso in 1962 on the initiative of Ambassador Agostino Giorgio Soldati.
- In the early 1990s, Barovier&Toso manufactured the chandeliers in the Hassan II Mosque in Casablanca.

== Location ==
The headquarters of Barovier&Toso is located in Murano in Fondamenta dei Vetrai 28. The main showrooms are housed nearby in Palazzo Barovier&Toso, a Venetian palazzo dating from 1920, situated on the opposite bank at Fondamenta Manin 1/D. Following a complete renovation of its interiors by the Milanese design studio Calvi Brambilla, the Palazzo opened to the public in November 2018.

== Galleria Barovier&Toso ==
The contemporary art gallery Galleria Barovier&Toso was founded in 2024 by Barovier&Toso's president Rinaldo Invernizzi, together with art historian Dr Mara Hofmann who serves as its executive director. Each project is conceived as a specifically curated collaboration between contemporary artists and the unique expertise of Murano's master glassmakers. The gallery's program focuses on the use of Murano glass as a medium for contemporary fine arts.

== Fondazione Barovier&Toso ==
The Barovier&Toso Foundation was established in 2024 by company president Rinaldo Invernizzi, with Dr Mara Hofmann and Michele Milani serving on its board of directors. The Foundation oversees the digitisation of Barovier&Toso's extensive historical archive and its publication online. It also builds a contemporary glass art collection, developed through collaboration with Galleria Barovier&Toso, preserving the company's engagement with contemporary art in glass for future generations and available for loan to institutions worldwide.
