= Marietta Barovier =

Venetian glass artist (fl. 1496)

Marietta Barovier (fl. 1496) was a Venetian glass artist.

She was the daughter of the glass artist Angelo Barovier of Murano, inventor of cristallo glass. Marietta Barovier and her brother, Giovanni, inherited her family workshop in 1460. She managed the workshop in collaboration with her brother. Of fourteen specialist glass painters (pictori) documented between 1443 and 1516, she and Elena de Laudo were the only women.

Her work cannot be clearly identified. She is known to have been the artist behind the glass beads called rosette or chevron beads in 1480. In 1487 she was noted to have been given the privilege to construct a special kiln (sua fornace parrula) for making "her beautiful, unusual and not blown works".

She is noted in 1496 in an inventory with her brother about a group of enamelled glasses.

== Bibliography ==
- Giovanni Sarpellon, Miniature di vetro. Murrine 1838–1924, Venezia, Arsenale editrice, 1990, ISBN 88-7743-080-X.
- Meredith Small, Inventing the World: Venice and the Transformation of Western Civilization
