= Elena de Laudo =

Italian artist

Elena Lando (also Elena de Laudo) (fl. 1445) was a Venetian glass artist.

She belonged to a glass painter family of Murano, and is recorded to have been employed decorating glass produced by the furnaces of glassmaker Salvatore Barovier. Of fourteen specialist glass painters (pictori) documented between 1443 and 1516, she and Marietta Barovier were the only women.
