= Chevron bead =

Type of glass beads

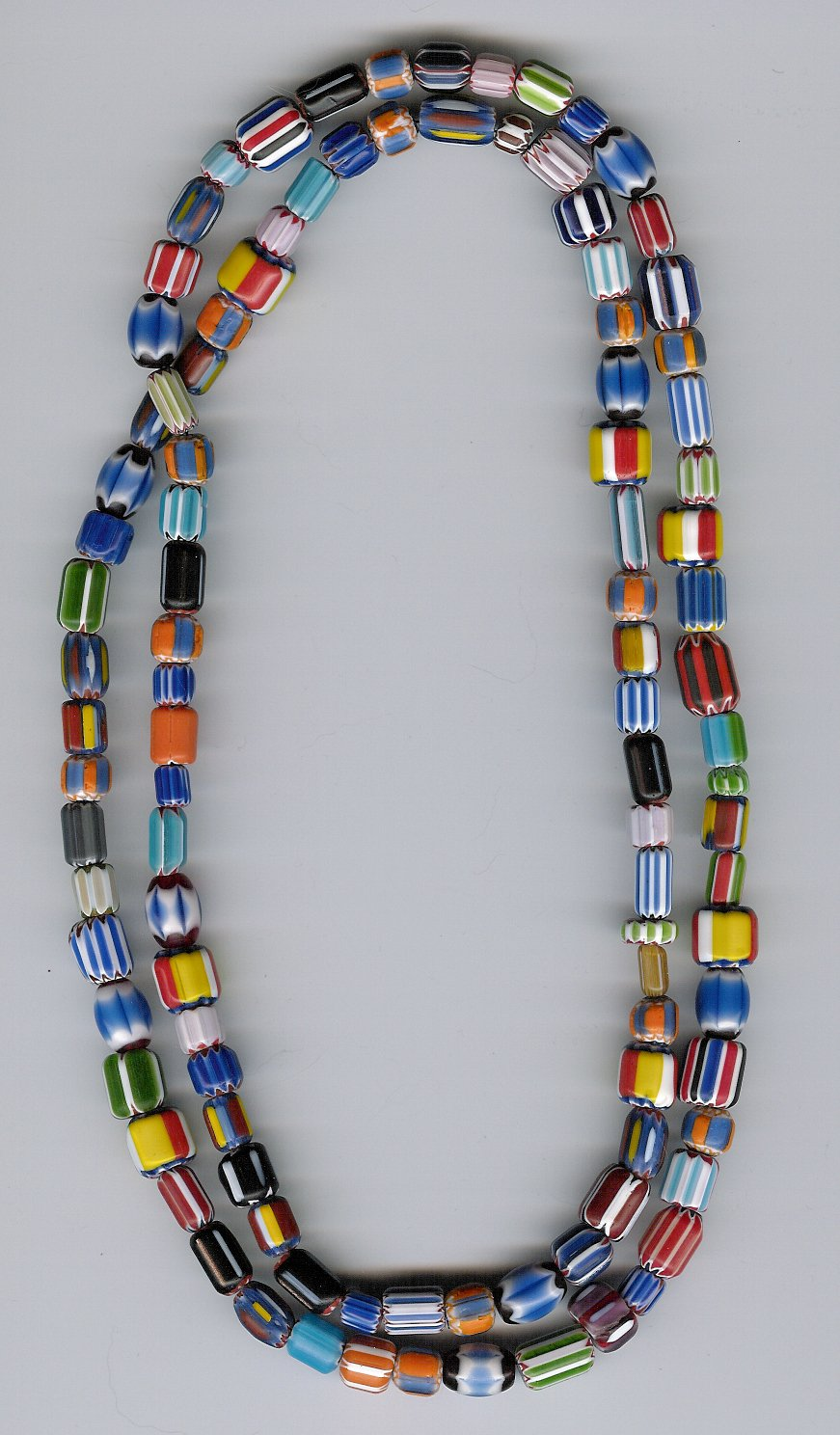
Modern Chevron Beads

Chevron beads are special glass beads; the first specimens of this type were created by glass bead makers in Venice and Murano, Italy, toward the end of the 14th century. The first examples were invented by Marietta Barovier. They may also be referred to as rosetta, or star beads. The term rosetta first appeared in the inventory of the Barovier Glass works in Murano, in 1496, in context with beads as well as with other glass objects.

Venetian chevron beads are drawn beads, made from glass canes, which are shaped using specifically constructed star moulds. The first chevron beads were made towards the end of the 15th century, consisting of 7 layers of alternating colours. They usually have 6 facets. Unlike their later counterparts, they were not always made with the standard 12-point star mould. By the beginning of the 20th century, 4 and 6-layer chevron beads appear on various sample cards. According to records kept at the Societa Veneziana Conterie of Murano, they stopped making chevron canes during the 1950s. Chevron beads are still being made in Venice today, albeit in very small quantities.

Chevron beads can be composed of a varied number of consecutive layers of colored glasses. The initial core is formed from a molten ball of glass (called a "gather") that was melted in a furnace. If the glassworker is making beads, an air bubble is blown into the center of the gather via a blowpipe, thus creating an opening, the future bead's perforation. When making solid multilayered cane intended to be used for decorating millefiori beads, no air bubble is inserted. The gather (with the air bubble in its center) is plunged into a star-shaped mould, which can have anywhere between five and fifteen points. Several layers of glass can be applied, returning to the mould as desired, to create either a star-shaped or smooth effect for each layer. After all layers have been applied, metal plates are affixed to the still hot glass, which is "drawn" or stretched out into a long rod, called a "cane", by pulling from both ends in opposite directions. The bubble at the center of the gather stretches with the cane and forms the hole in the bead, i.e. the bead's perforation. The diameter of the cane, and therefore of the resulting beads, is determined by the amount of glass in the original gather and also by how thinly the glass is drawn out. The cooled glass cane is cut into short segments which reveal a star pattern in cross-section. The segments may be beveled or ground, to reveal the characteristic chevron pattern from which the English name is derived. The chevron pattern becomes apparent after the beads' ends have been ground. Only rosetta/star beads with ground ends (either faceted, rounded, or chamfered), and with their inner layers exposed, are "chevron" beads. All star beads with flat ends are more aptly termed rosetta/star beads.

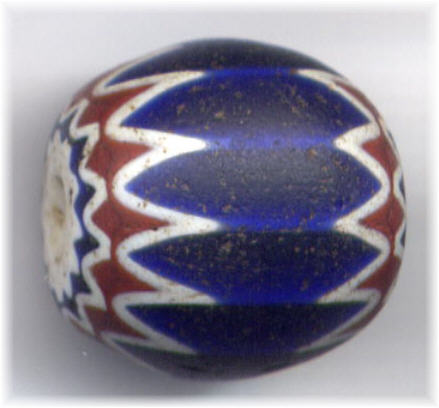
Chevron bead, Venetian

Most of the Venetian chevron beads made for export to West Africa and to the Americas have layers in red, blue, and white. A smaller number of chevron beads were produced with other colors such as green, black and yellow. Venetian chevron beads have been traded throughout the world, most heavily in West Africa, where they were first introduced by Dutch merchants in the late 15th century. Some very small sized 7 layer Venetian chevron beads, also made during the late 15th century, are found exclusively in the Americas, mainly in Peru, and attributed to having been introduced by Christopher Columbus. Chevron beads are very popular collector's items and they are still highly valued in present-day West Africa, where they continue to be worn for prestige and ceremonial purposes, and occasionally buried with the dead. In addition to Italy, today chevron and rosetta/star beads are manufactured in India, China and the United States.

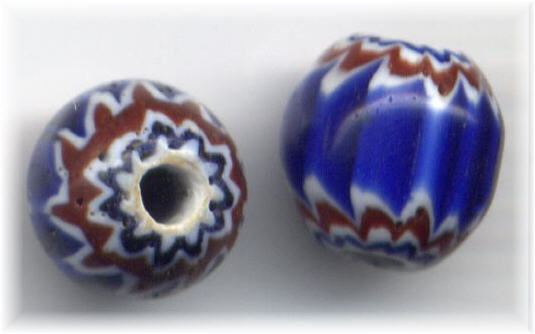
Chevron beads, Indian

When the bead making industries in India began making chevron beads during the 1980s, the star beads made in Purdalpur, one of the glass bead making centers, were made without the use of a mould, from prepared sections of hot strips of glass that were fused together to form a cane. Because of this method of manufacture, the points of the stars of these beads typically have slight indentations.

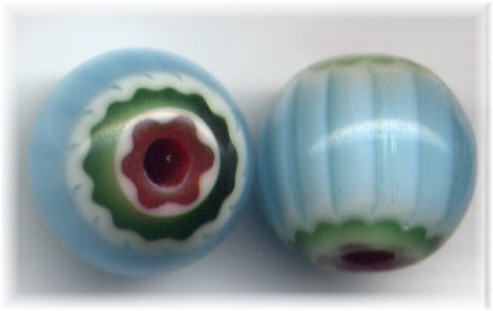
Chevron beads, Chinese

Chinese chevron beads are made from moulded star canes like Venetian chevron beads. They have well-formed star patterns and imitate Venetian beads.

The best known contemporary chevron bead makers are the chevron pioneer Art Seymour, from the United States, who has made chevron beads consisting of up to 19 layers, and Luigi Cattelan, from Murano, Italy. Chevron and rosetta/star beads can now be found in many different color combinations.
