= Zoldo Alto =

- Frazione
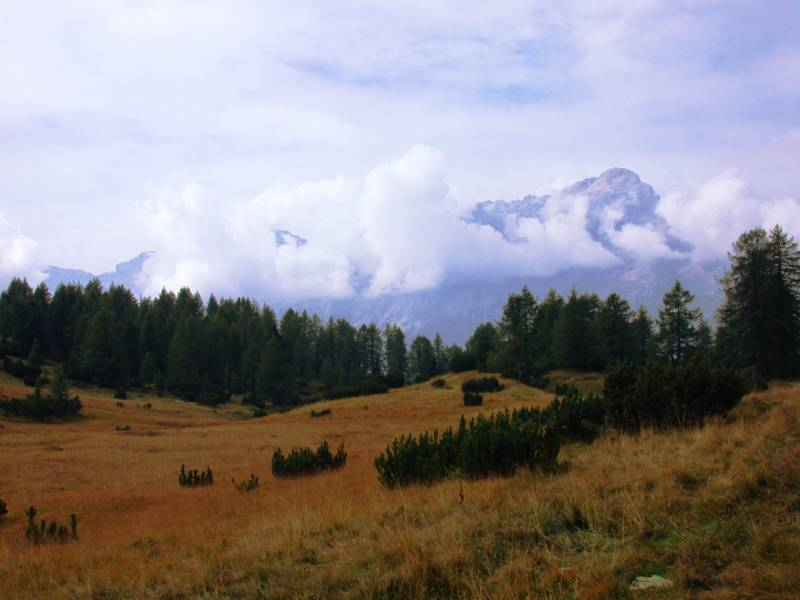

- Location of Zoldo Alto in Italy
- Coordinates: 46°22′31″N 12°7′35″E
- Country: Italy
- Region: Veneto
- Province: Belluno (BL)
- Comune: Val di Zoldo

Area
  - Total: 619 km^{2} (239 sq mi)
- Elevation: 1,177 m (3,862 ft)

Population
  - Total: 1,183
  - Density: 1.91/km^{2} (4.95/sq mi)
- Demonym: Zoldani
- Time zone: UTC+1 (CET)
  - Summer (DST): UTC+2 (CEST)
- Postal code: 32010
- Dialing code: 0437
- Patron saint: San Nicolò
- Saint day: 6 December
- Website: Official website

Zoldo Alto is a town in the province of Belluno, Veneto, Italy. It has been a frazione of Val di Zoldo since 2016. It is noted for its ski resort. A boarding school was established in the 1950s, used by the children during spring and autumn and senior citizens during the winter months. On 31 January 1991 the municipality was affected by the Ru Duelle Roe landslide, which affected the right flank of the Ru delle Roe stream in the dolomitic slopes of Cime di San Sebastiano and Moiazza. The region is a producer of fresh and mature cheeses.
