= Val di Zoldo =

- Comune
- Comune di Val di Zoldo
- Location within Italy Location within Veneto
- Coordinates: 46°20′55.32″N 12°10′58.8″E
- Country: Italy
- Region: Veneto
- Province: Belluno (BL)
- Frazioni: Forno di Zoldo, Zoldo Alto

Government
  - Mayor: Camillo De Pellegrin

Area
  - Total: 141.65 km^{2} (54.69 sq mi)

Population (31 December 2015)
  - Total: 3,242
  - Density: 22.89/km^{2} (59.28/sq mi)
- Time zone: UTC+1 (CET)
  - Summer (DST): UTC+2 (CEST)
- Postal code: 32010, 32012
- Dialing code: 0437
- Website: Official website

Val di Zoldo is a comune (municipality) in the Province of Belluno in the Italian region Veneto.

It was established on 23 February 2016 by the merger of the municipalities of Forno di Zoldo and Zoldo Alto.

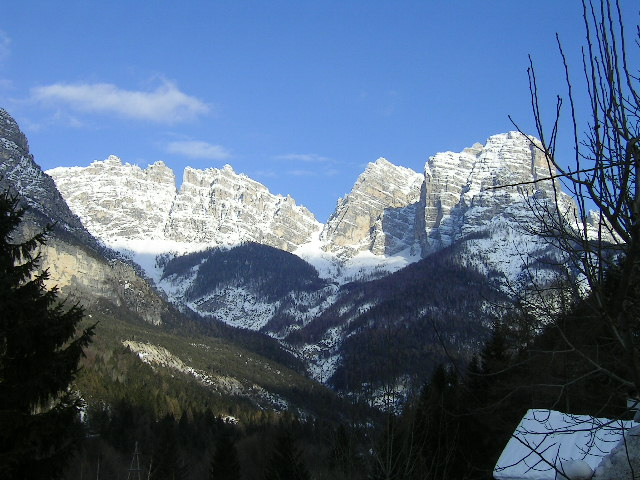
Winter landscape of the town

== See also ==
- Cibiana Pass
