= Cristallo =

Type of glass

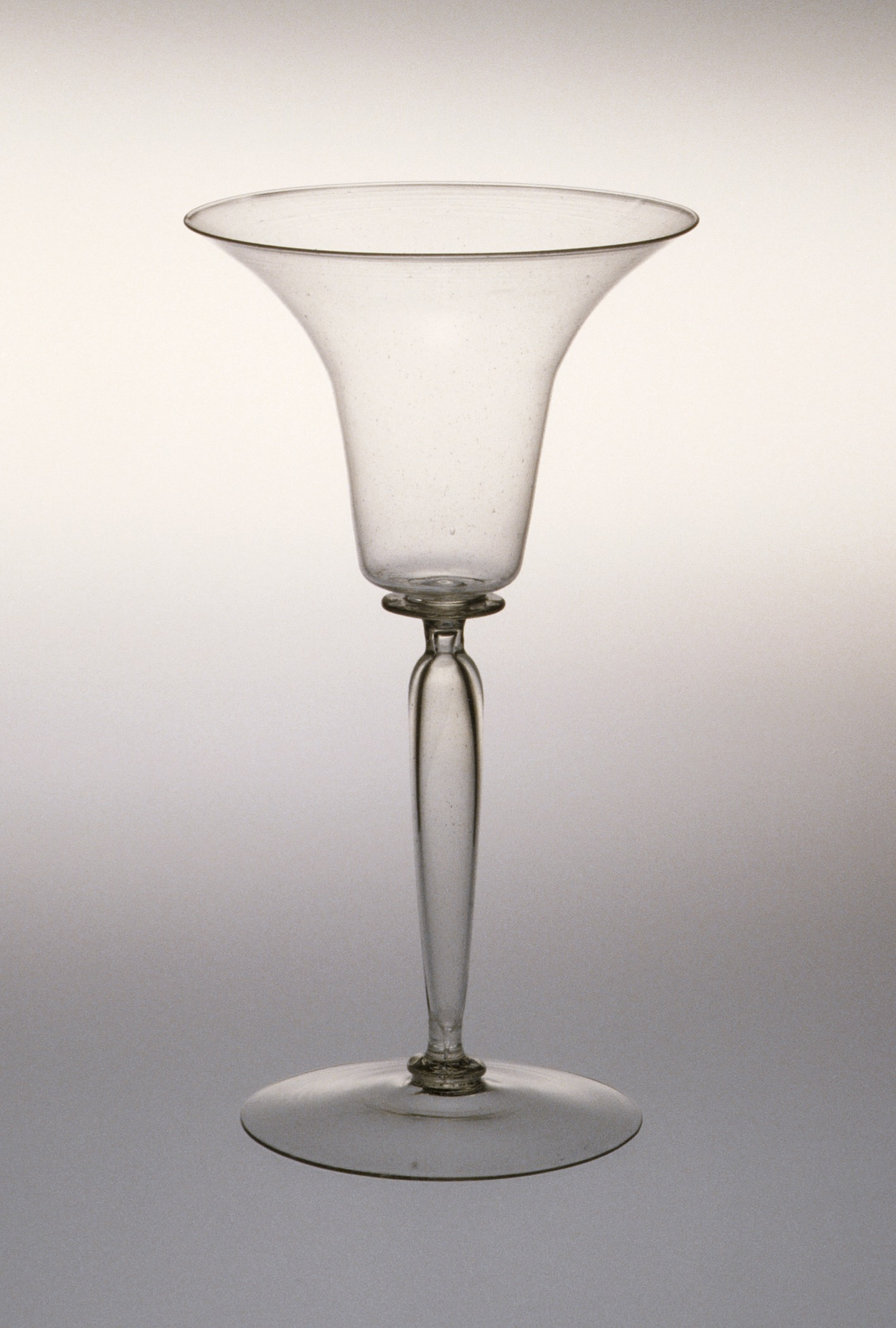
Cristallo drinking glass circa 1550–1650

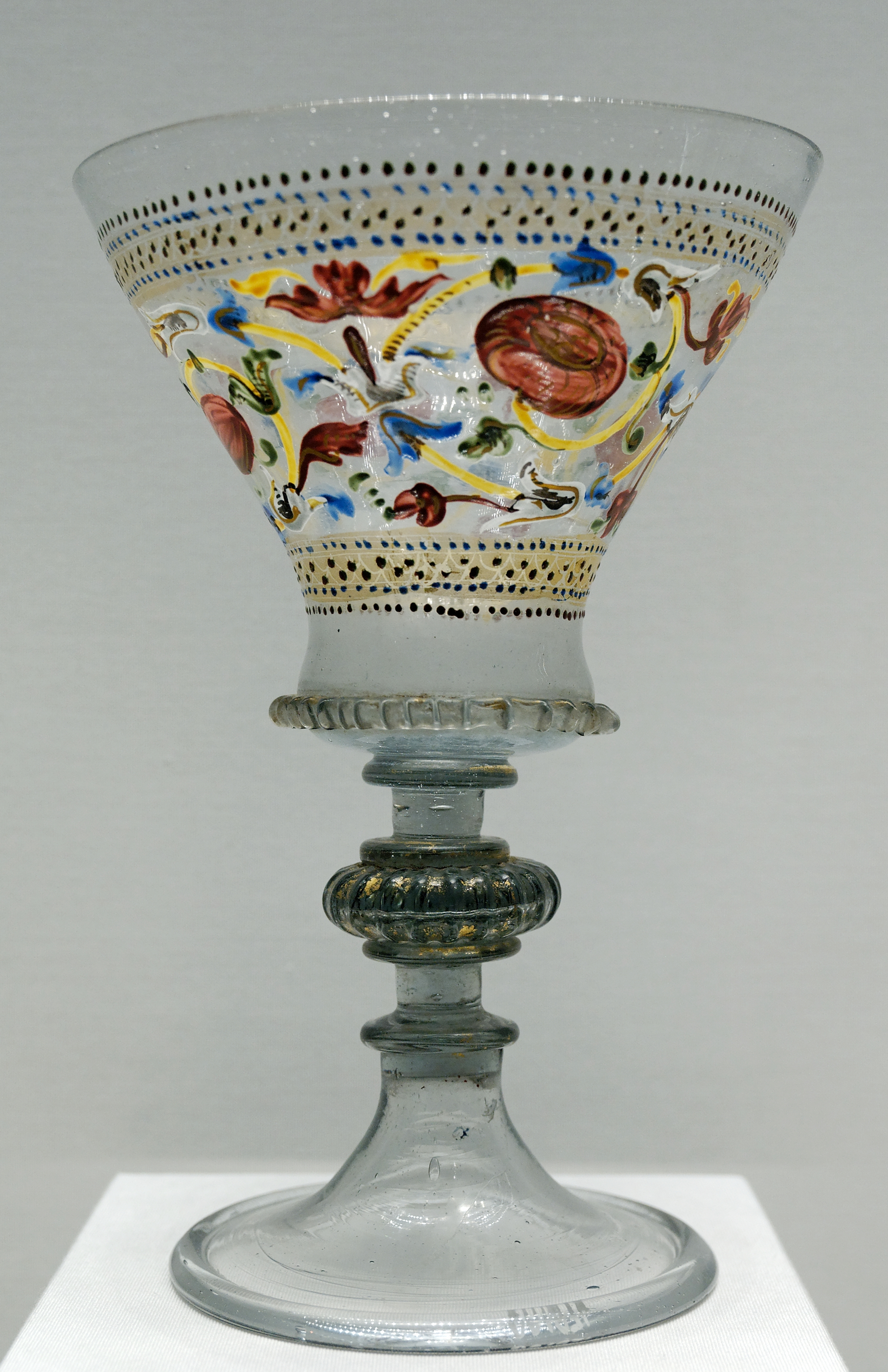
Cristallo stem glass, Louvre

Cristallo is a glass that is totally clear (like rock crystal), without the slight yellow or greenish color originating from iron oxide impurities. This effect is achieved through small additions of manganese oxide. Cristallo often has a low lime content, which makes it prone to glass corrosion (otherwise known as glass disease).

The invention of Cristallo glass is attributed to Angelo Barovier around 1450.

== Materials ==
In addition to common glass making materials, manganese, quartz pebbles, and alume catino, a particularly suitable form of soda ash, are used in the making of cristallo glass.

Rather than using common sand, crushed quartz pebbles were used instead. The quartz pebbles were typically from the Ticino and the Adige rivers. The quartz pebbles went through a rigorous screening process before being chosen for use in cristallo production. The quartz pebbles had to be free of yellow and black veins and also had to be able to produce sparks when struck with steel.

The quartz pebbles which passed the selection process were heated to the point where the stones began to glow, then placed into cold water. Then the pebbles were crushed and ground.

The typical flux used in the production of cristallo was called alume catino. Alume catino was derived from the ash of the salsola soda and salsola kali bushes that grew in the Levantine coastal region. It was found to contain high and constant amounts of sodium and calcium carbonates, necessary to make workable and chemically stable glass.

The ash of the plants was carefully sieved and placed into water to be gently boiled with constant mixing. Then the ashen mixture was placed into shallow pans to be dried. The alume catino would repeatedly undergo the boiling and drying process until all of the salt was extracted from the ashes.

== Process ==
The crushed and ground quartz was mixed with the purified alume catino and constantly mixed at high temperatures. The top of the molten batch would then be skimmed off. By skimming the top of the molten glass, unreacted and undissolved chlorides and sulfates in the mixture were removed.

The molten glass would then be ladled into vats of water. The water removed chloride and sulfate impurities from the mixture. The process of remelting and placing the molten mixture into vats of water was repeated several times until the glass-makers were satisfied.

Next the glass was placed into a furnace that was heated to the highest temperature possible and left there for several days. The material was stirred continually to eliminate defects, such as bubbles.

The refined mixture was then taken, heated, and shaped into blocks called frit. The frit was then taken and remelted and skimmed once again in order to remove impurities. The batch then had manganese added to the mixture, helping to rid the cristallo of any color tints. This step was repeated until the glassmakers were satisfied.

Afterward, the molten mixture was ready to be shaped by glassmakers into pieces of cristalloware.
