= Castello di Botestagno =

Coordinates: 46.5967°N 12.1128°E

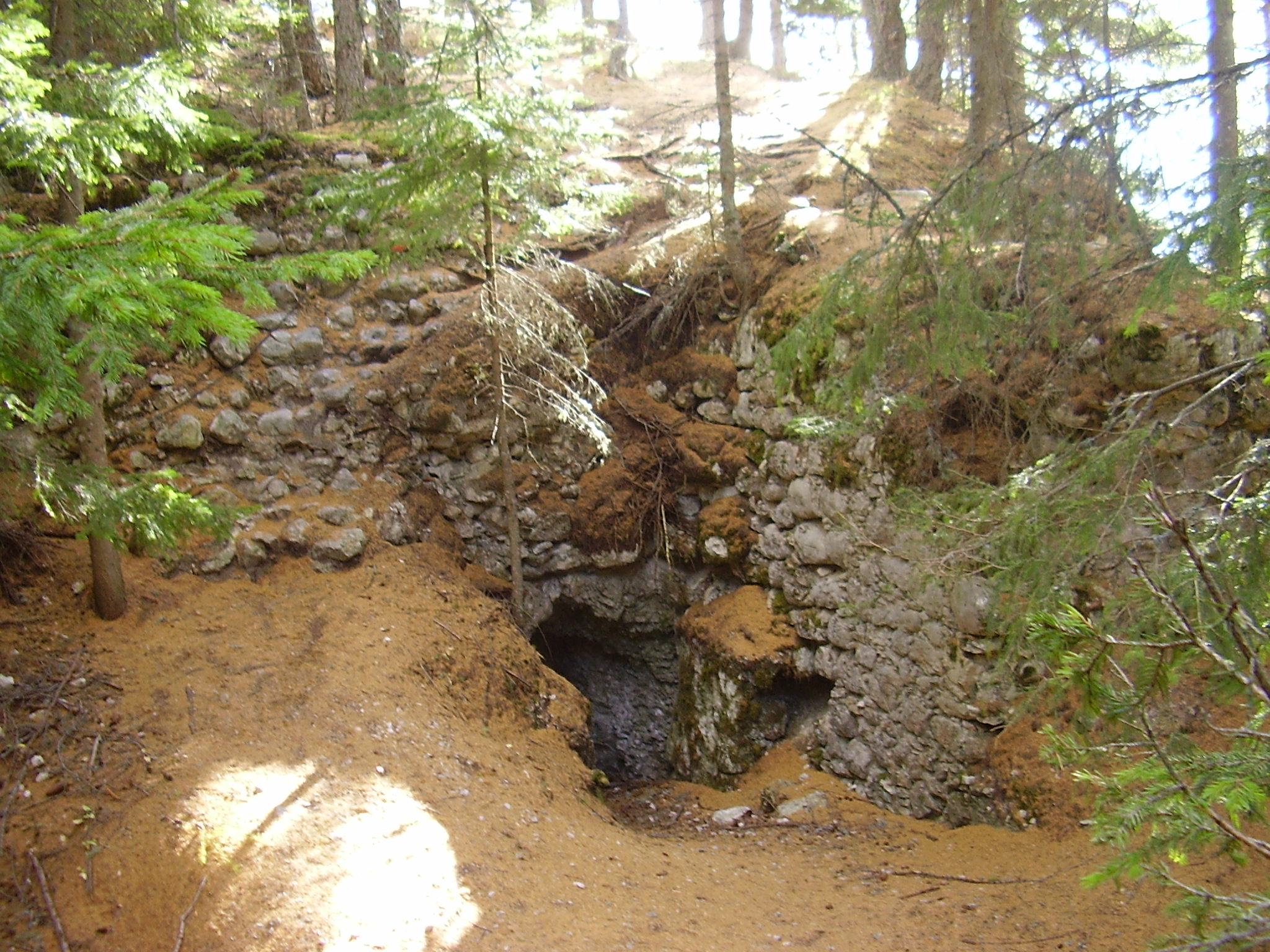
Castello di Botestagno.

Castello di Botestagno (also known as Podestagno, or Peutelstein in German) is a ruined medieval fort in the comune of Cortina d'Ampezzo in the southern (Dolomitic) Alps of the Veneto region of Northern Italy. It is perched on a rock in the valley of the Boite River, a little further north of Cortina, in the town of Prà del Caštel.

== History ==
It is believed that it was first erected as a stakeout during conflict with the Lombards between the seventh and eighth centuries, with the aim of dominating the three valleys that converge beneath it: the Boite, the Val di Fanes and the Val Felizon. The corner stone, however, probably dates to the 11th century. It was held by the Germans until 1077, and then by the patriarchs of Aquileia (12th century) and the da Camino (13th century), until Botestagno became the seat of a captaincy. It then passed into Venetian hands and finally to the Habsburgs in 1511. During the 18th century the castle lost importance gradually, until it was auctioned in 1782 by order of Emperor Joseph II.

Today the fort has now almost completely disappeared; only the remnants of what must have been the wine cellars and the foundations remain, now weathered and largely covered up by vegetation.
