= Vodo di Cadore =

Vodo Cadore
- Comune
- Comune di Vodo Cadore
- Coat of arms

- Location within Italy Location within Veneto
- Coordinates: 46°25′N 12°15′E
- Country: Italy
- Region: Veneto
- Province: Belluno (BL)
- Frazioni: Peaio, Vinigo

Area
  - Total: 46 km^{2} (18 sq mi)
- Elevation: 940 m (3,080 ft)

Population (2018-01-01)
  - Total: 934
  - Density: 20/km^{2} (53/sq mi)
- Time zone: UTC+1 (CET)
  - Summer (DST): UTC+2 (CEST)
- Postal code: 32040
- Dialing code: 0435
- Patron saint: Saint Lucy
- Saint day: 13 December

Vodo Cadore is a comune (municipality) in the province of Belluno in the Italian region of Veneto, located about 110 kilometres (68 mi) north of Venice and about 30 kilometres (19 mi) north of Belluno, in the mid-Boite valley, between the two Dolomites massifs of Antelao and Monte Pelmo.

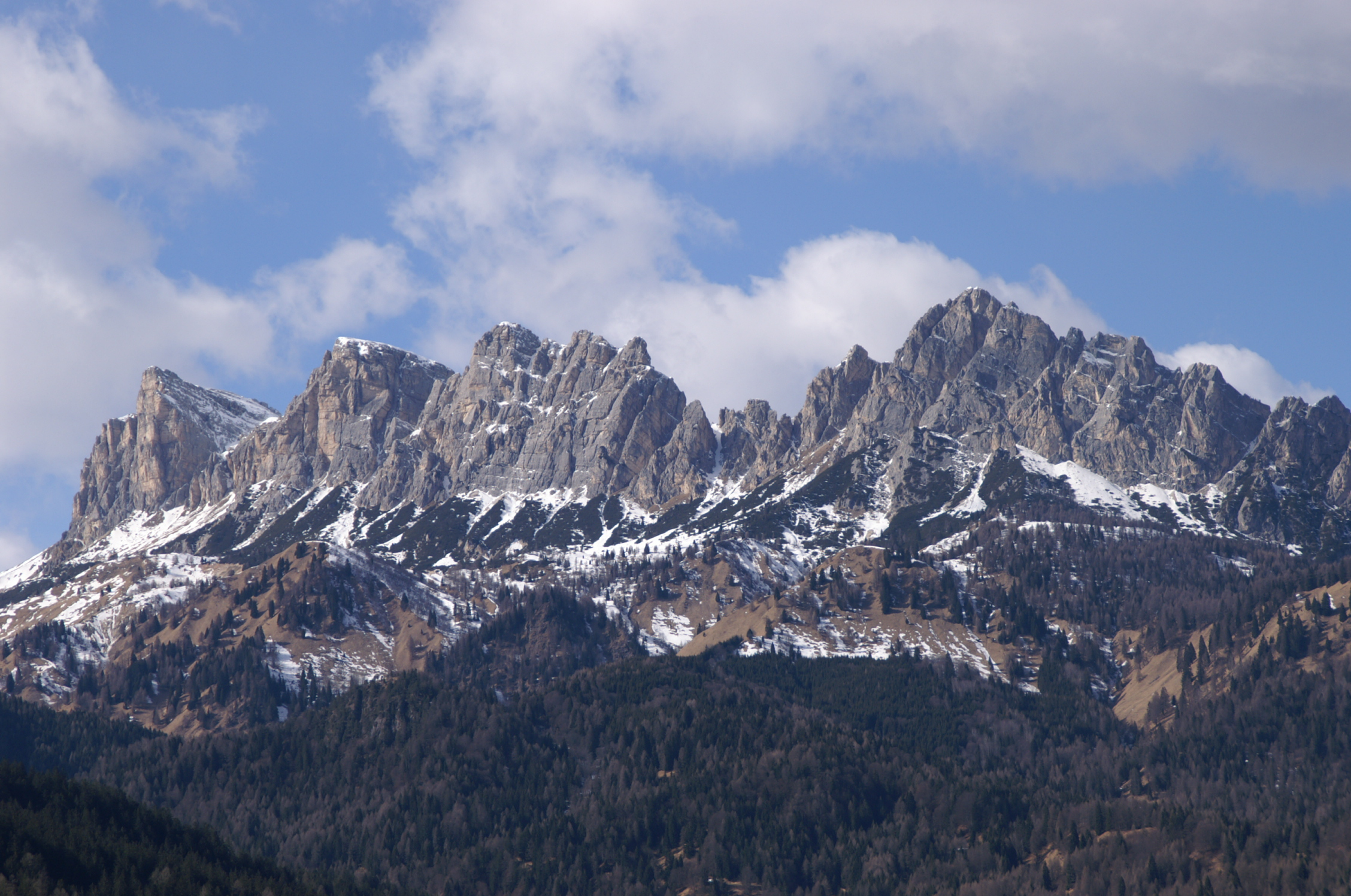
The mountains of the town
