= Angelo Barovier =

Italian artist

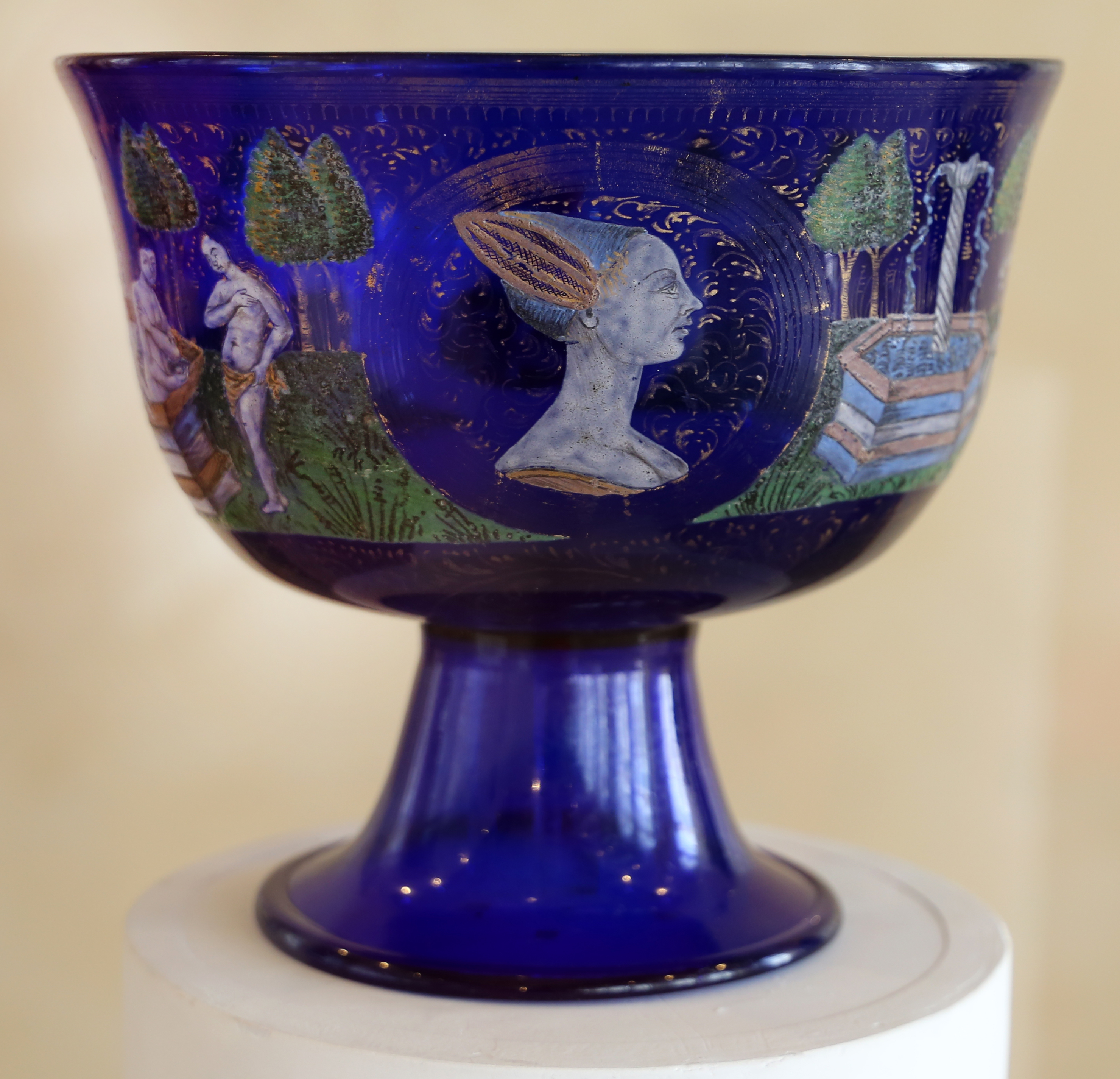
The cup in Museum of Glass Murano

Angelo Barovier (c. 1400, in Venice – 1460, in Venice) was an Italian glass artist. Raised in the Barovier family, which had a long tradition of glass working, Barovier is considered the best-known member and significant for uniting the knowledge passed down for generations as an artist and a scientist.

Biographical details about Barovier are few and fragmentary, but relate his ability in the treatment of glass. The humanist Ludovico Carbone, for example, described Angelum Venetum as optimum artificem crystallinorum vasorum (largest producer of crystalline vessels). Another testimony to the high esteem for Barovier is the decree of Venetian Republic in around 1455 that granted him the rights to keep producing clean glass during annual furance closure, produced by a technique he developed, which he called crystal glass or Venetian crystal. According to some, Barovier should be recognized for originally developing a glass paste called Chalcedony.

At the request of Filaret, architect of the Dukes of Milan, Barovier was summoned in 1455 at the court of Milan in order to suggest the best glass paste to be used in the construction of Sforzinda, the ideal city desired by Francesco Sforza and designed (but never implemented) by the same Filaret.

There are no known true works of Barovier; in the nineteenth century, historians assign him a wedding Cup in the museum of the glass Murano, the cup of birds to Trent and a blue glass in the City Museum Medieval of Bologna but these post-date Angelo's life time.

== The Barovier family ==
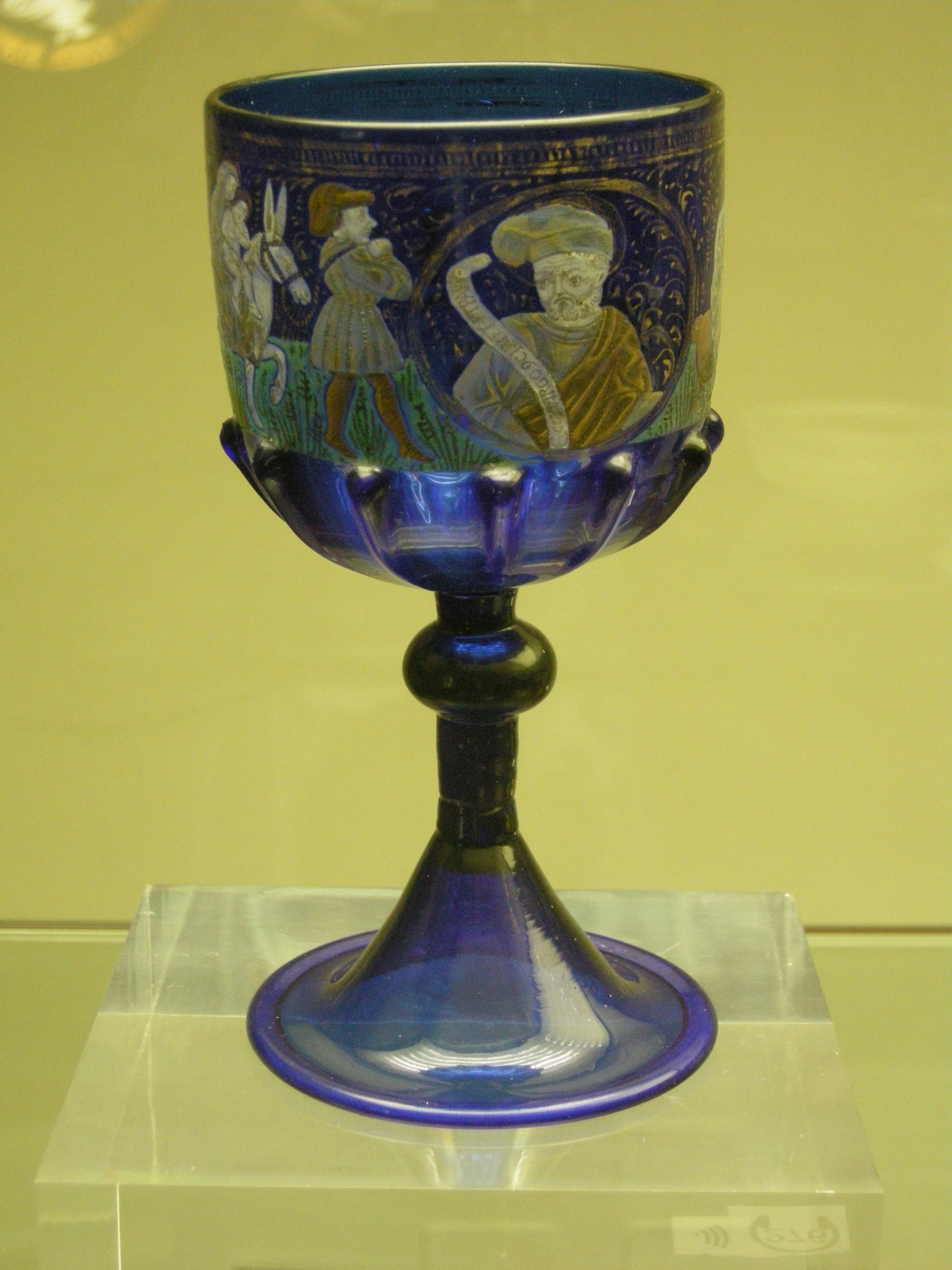
Murano by Angelo Barovier

The name Barovier comes from the word berroviere, which means an armiger guarding the captain of the people. It is likely that a Barovier, originally from Treviso, settled in Murano – a settlement situated on islands one mile north of Venice – after 1291 when a law of the Venetian Republic required all glass furnaces to be situated in Murano due to the fear of them causing fires in Venice.

The oldest representative of the family of which we know is Jacobello (born around 1295), whose sons Antonio and Bartolomeo are mentioned in documents of 1348 as fiolari (glassmakers). A son of Bartolomeo, Jacopo, remembered as a master glassmaker and a furnace owner, was Angelo’s father.

One of Angelo's children, Marietta inherited the family workshop along with her brother Giovanni in 1460.

== See also ==
- Barovier & Toso
