= Valle di Cadore =

- Comune
- Comune di Valle di Cadore
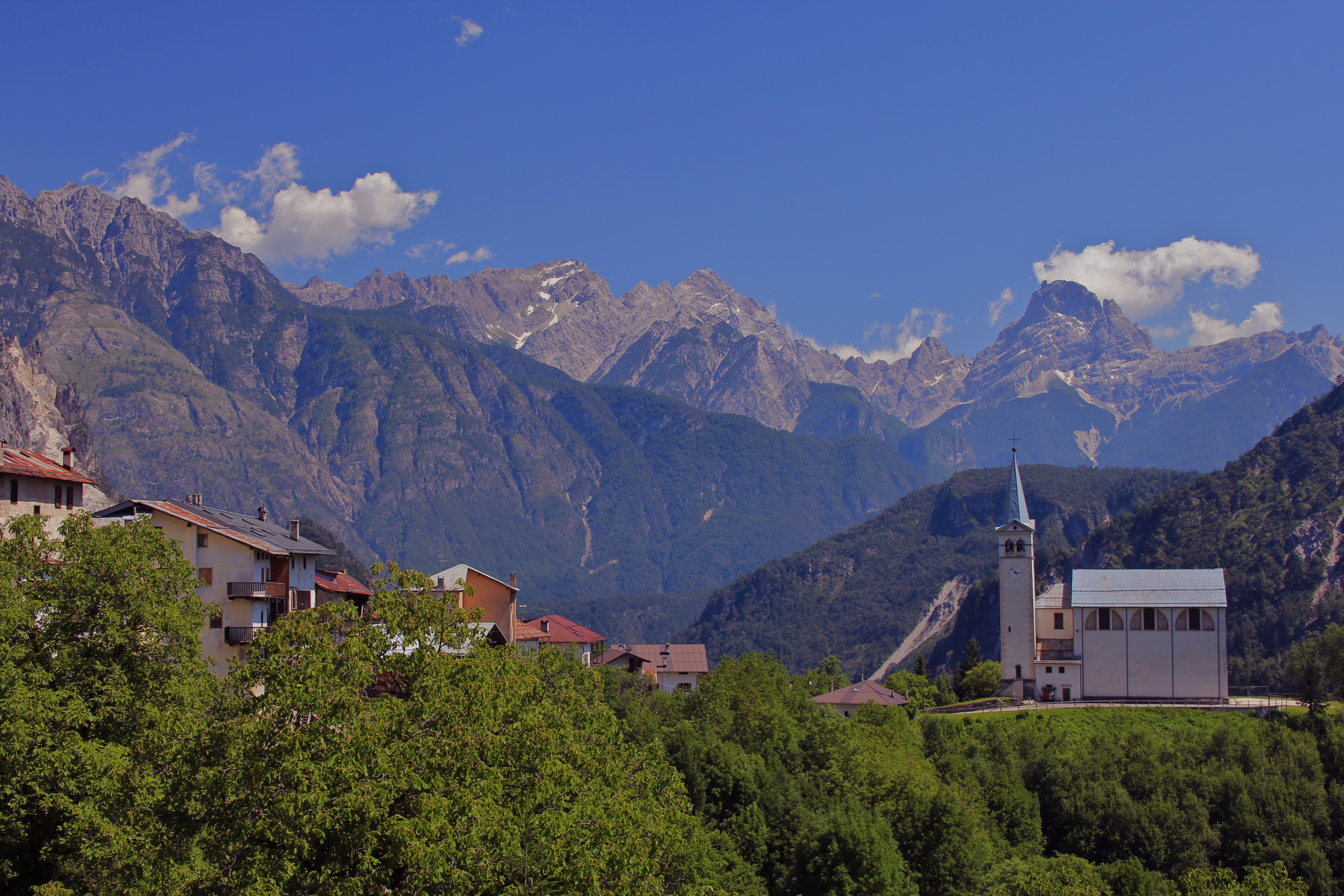

- Location within Italy Location within Veneto
- Coordinates: 46°25′N 12°20′E
- Country: Italy
- Region: Veneto
- Province: Belluno (BL)
- Frazioni: Suppiane, Vallesina, Venas di Cadore

Government
  - Mayor: Matteo Toscani

Area
  - Total: 41.3 km^{2} (15.9 sq mi)
- Elevation: 851 m (2,792 ft)

Population (Dec. 2004)
  - Total: 2,092
  - Density: 50.7/km^{2} (131/sq mi)
- Demonym: Vallesani
- Time zone: UTC+1 (CET)
  - Summer (DST): UTC+2 (CEST)
- Postal code: 32040
- Dialing code: 0435
- Patron saint: St. Martin
- Saint day: November 11

Valle di Cadore is a comune (municipality) in the province of Belluno in the Italian region of Veneto, located about 110 km (68 mi) north of Venice and about 35 km (22 mi) northeast of Belluno.

Valle is part of the Cadore Valley, not far from the Antelao peak, 3,264 metres (10,709 ft) above sea level. The main attraction is the Renaissance Palazzo Costantini Lanza.

== History ==
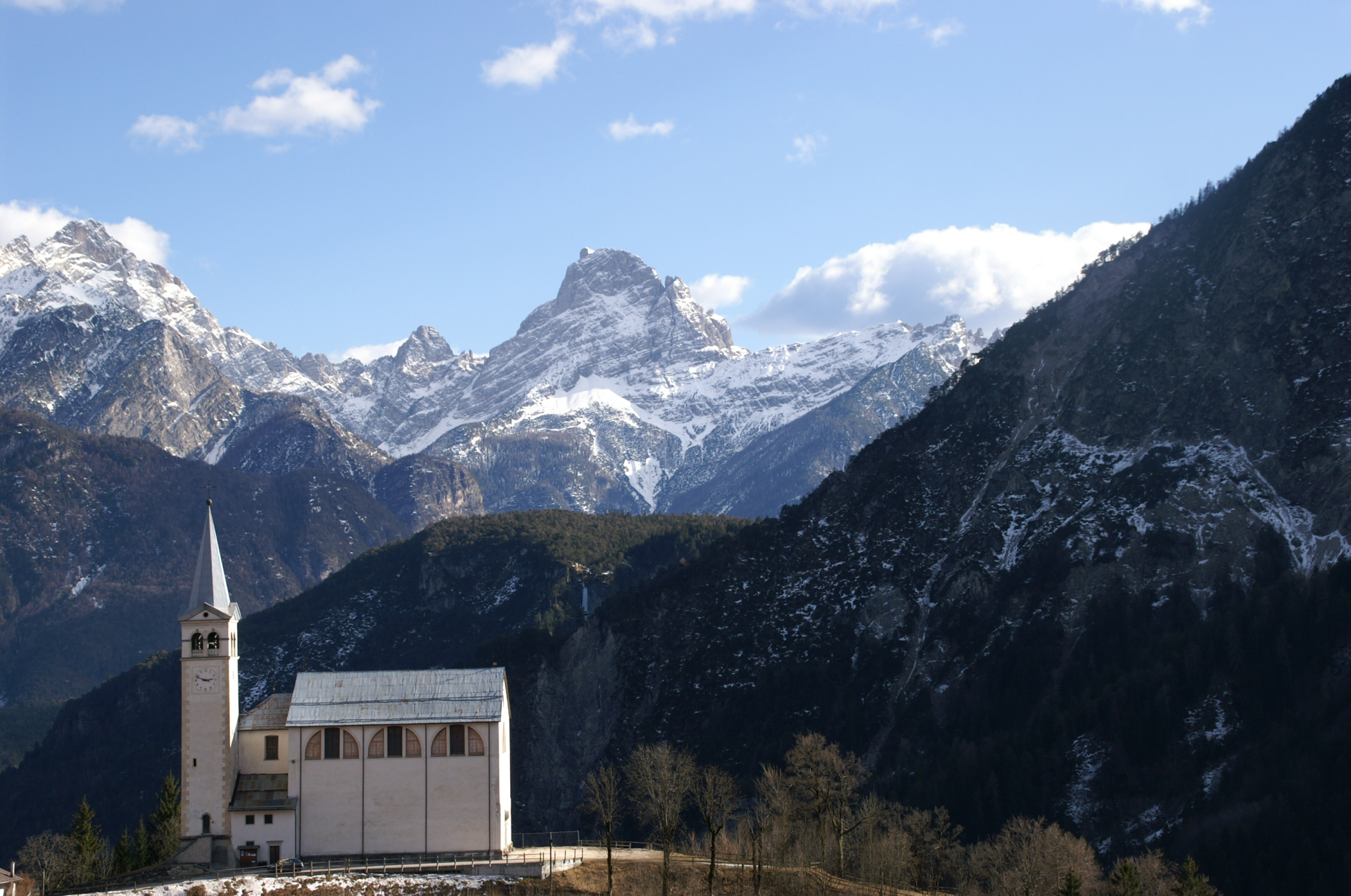
Parish Church with the mountains

Known simply as Valle until 1867, it was a castrum of the Romans, who also had a road built here to connect to the Via Claudia Augusta Altinate.

Titian, the painter, was born here around 1477.

During the War of the League of Cambrai, in 1508, it was the seat of a battle of the Venetians and the Cadorines against the Habsburg Holy Roman Emperor Maximilian I.

== Twin towns ==
- Claro, Switzerland
