= Forno di Zoldo =

- Frazione
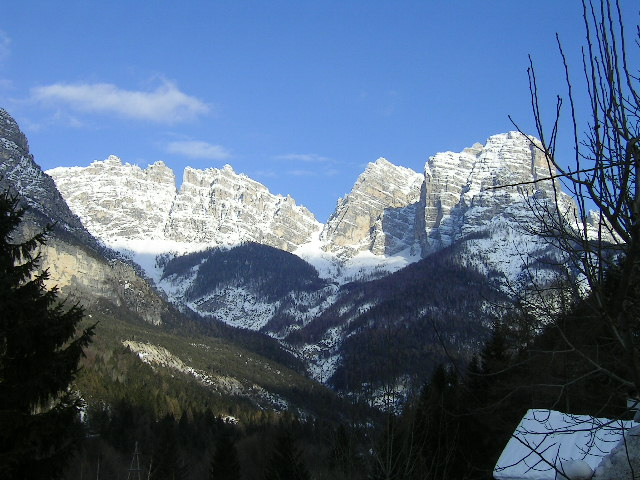

- Location of Forno di Zoldo in Italy
- Coordinates: 46°21′N 12°11′E
- Country: Italy
- Region: Veneto
- Province: Province of Belluno (BL)
- Comune: Val di Zoldo

Area
  - Total: 79.9 km^{2} (30.8 sq mi)

Population (Dec. 2004)
  - Total: 2,784
  - Density: 34.8/km^{2} (90.2/sq mi)
- Time zone: UTC+1 (CET)
  - Summer (DST): UTC+2 (CEST)
- Postal code: 32012
- Dialing code: 0437

Forno di Zoldo was a comune (municipality) in the Province of Belluno in the Italian region Veneto, located about 100 kilometres (62 mi) north of Venice and about 25 kilometres (16 mi) north of Belluno. It has been a frazione of Val di Zoldo since 2016. On 31 December 2004, it had a population of 2,784 and an area of 79.9 square kilometres (30.8 mi^{2}).

== Demographic evolution ==
Historical population

Year	Pop.	±%
1861	?	—
1871	4,353	—
1881	4,814	+10.6%
1901	4,984	+3.5%
1911	5,041	+1.1%

Year	Pop.	±%
1921	5,241	+4.0%
1931	4,287	−18.2%
1936	3,965	−7.5%
1951	3,978	+0.3%
1961	4,164	+4.7%

Year	Pop.	±%
1971	3,899	−6.4%
1981	3,283	−15.8%
1991	3,118	−5.0%
2001	2,892	−7.2%

Source: Data from ISTAT
