= Louise of Valois =

French princess

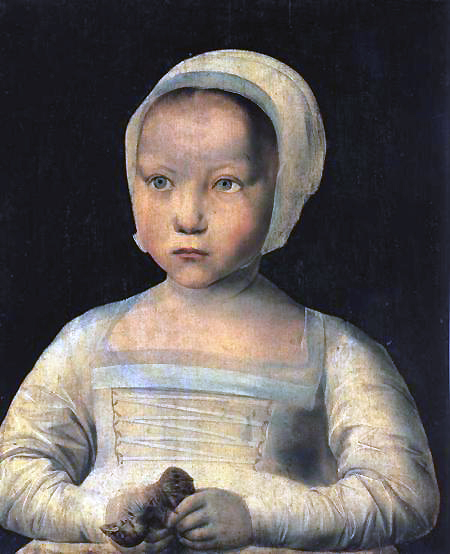
- Possible portrait by Jean Clouet
- Born: 19 August 1515; Amboise, France
- Died: 21 September 1518 (aged 3)
- House: Valois-Angoulême
- Father: Francis I of France
- Mother: Claude of France

Louise of Valois (c. 19 August 1515 – 21 September 1518), was the first child and first daughter of King Francis I of France and his first wife, Claude of France. She died in infancy, but was betrothed to Charles I of Spain for much of her life.

== Life ==
Born on 19 August 1515, Louise of France was the first child born to the newly-ascended King of France, Francis I, and his first wife, Claude of France, Duchess of Brittany. Claude was the eldest child of King Louis XII, whom Francis succeeded. To end hostilities between France and Spain, the twelve-month old Louise was promised in marriage to Charles I of Spain, who would later go on to become Holy Roman Emperor. The Treaty of Noyon mandated that if Louise were to die, Charles would be obligated to wed another daughter of King Francis, or Renée, Queen Claude's sister. Either option would involve France ceding its claim to the Kingdom of Naples to Charles. In exchange, Charles would pay Francis a pension of a hundred thousand crowns a year until the wedding, and half of that amount annually if the marriage were to remain childless. If no marriage materialized, then Francis would retain the claim to Naples. The treaty also mandated that Louise was to remain under the care of Queen Claude until she turned eight, and was not to be married until the age of twelve.

However, Louise died at the age of three on 21 September 1518, and Charles was betrothed instead to her younger sister Charlotte, though he would eventually marry Isabella of Portugal once the two countries went to war again.

== Sources ==
- Pardoe, Julia (1849). The Court and Reign of Francis the First, King of France (1 ed.). Lea and Blanchard. ISBN 127833193X.
- Robertson, William (1843). The History of the Reign of Emperor Charles V: With a View of the Progress of Society in Europe, from the Subversion of the Roman Empire, to the Beginning of the Sixteenth Century. Harper. ISBN 1143156226.
