= Claude of France =

Queen of France (1515–1524) and Duchess of Brittany (1514–1524)

Claude
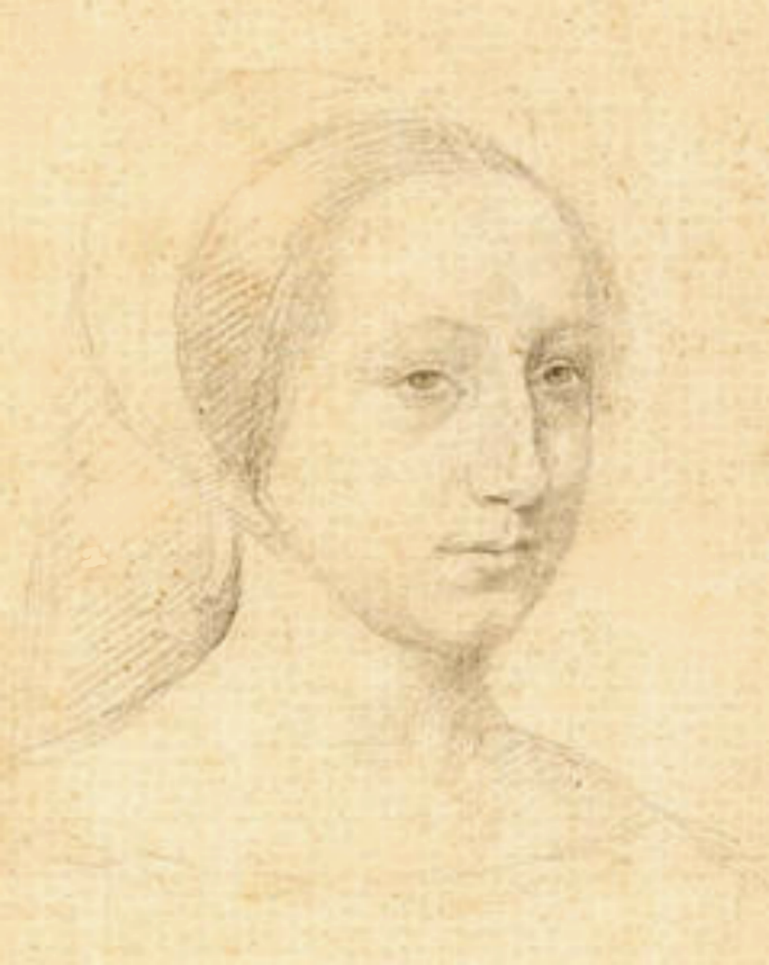
- Contemporary image of Claude, c. 1520

Duchess of Brittany
- Reign: 9 January 1514 – 26 July 1524
- Predecessor: Anne
- Successor: Francis III

Queen consort of France
- Tenure: 1 January 1515 – 26 July 1524
- Coronation: 10 May 1517
- Born: 13 October 1499; Romorantin-Lanthenay, Loir-et-Cher, France
- Died: 26 July 1524 (aged 24); Château de Blois, Loir-et-Cher, France
- Burial: Saint Denis Basilica, Paris, France
- Spouse: Francis I of France (m. 1514)
- Issue Detail: Louise of Valois; Charlotte of Valois; Francis III, Duke of Brittany; Henry II, King of France; Madeleine, Queen of Scots; Charles II, Duke of Orléans; Margaret, Duchess of Savoy
- House: Valois-Orléans
- Father: Louis XII of France
- Mother: Anne of Brittany

Claude of France (13 October 1499 – 26 July 1524) was suo jure Duchess of Brittany and Queen of France as the wife of Francis I. She was the elder daughter of Louis XII of France and Anne, Duchess of Brittany.

== Life ==
Claude was born on 13 October 1499 in Romorantin-Lanthenay as the eldest daughter of King Louis XII of France and his second wife, Duchess Anne of Brittany. She was named after Claudius of Besançon, a saint her mother had invoked during a pilgrimage so she could give birth to a living child. During her two marriages, Anne had at least fourteen pregnancies, of whom only two children survived to adulthood: Claude and her youngest sister Renée, born in 1510.

=== Marriage negotiations ===
Because her mother had no surviving sons, Claude was heir presumptive to the Duchy of Brittany. The crown of France, however, could pass only to and through male heirs, according to Salic Law. Eager to keep Brittany separated from the French crown, Queen Anne, with help of Cardinal Georges d'Amboise, promoted a solution for this problem, a marriage contract between Claude and the future Holy Roman Emperor Charles V.

This sparked a dispute between the Cardinal and Pierre de Rohan-Gié (1451–1513), Lord of Rohan, known as the Marshal of Gié, who fervently supported the idea of a marriage between the princess and Francis, Duke of Valois, the heir presumptive to the French throne, which would keep Brittany united to France.

On 10 August 1501 at Lyon the marriage contract between Claude and the future Charles V was signed by François de Busleyden, Archbishop of Besançon, William de Croÿ, Nicolas de Rutter and Pierre Lesseman, all ambassadors of Duke Philip of Burgundy, Charles' father. A part of the contract promised the inheritance of Brittany to the young prince, already the next in line to thrones of Castile and Aragon, Austria and the Burgundian Estates.

In addition, the first Treaty of Blois, signed in 1504, gave Claude a considerable dowry in the case of her father's death without male heirs: besides Brittany, Claude also received the Duchies of Milan and Burgundy, the Counties of Blois and Asti and the territory of the Republic of Genoa, then occupied by France.

In 1505, her father, Louis, very sick, cancelled Claude's engagement to Charles in the Estates Generals of Tours, in favor of his heir, Francis, Duke of Valois. Louise of Savoy had obtained from the king a secret promise that Claude would be married to her son. Queen Anne, furious to see the triumph of the Marshal of Gié, exerted all her influence to obtain his conviction for treason before the Parliament of Paris.

=== Duchess of Brittany ===
Coat of arms of Queen Claude.

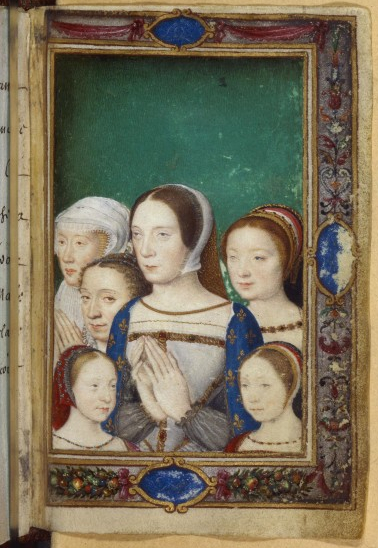
Claude surrounded by her daughters (Charlotte, Madeleine and Marguerite), her sister Renée (or her deceased older daughter Louise) and her husband's second wife Eleanor of Austria, in the Livre d'heures de Catherine de Medicis, 1550. Bibliothèque nationale de France

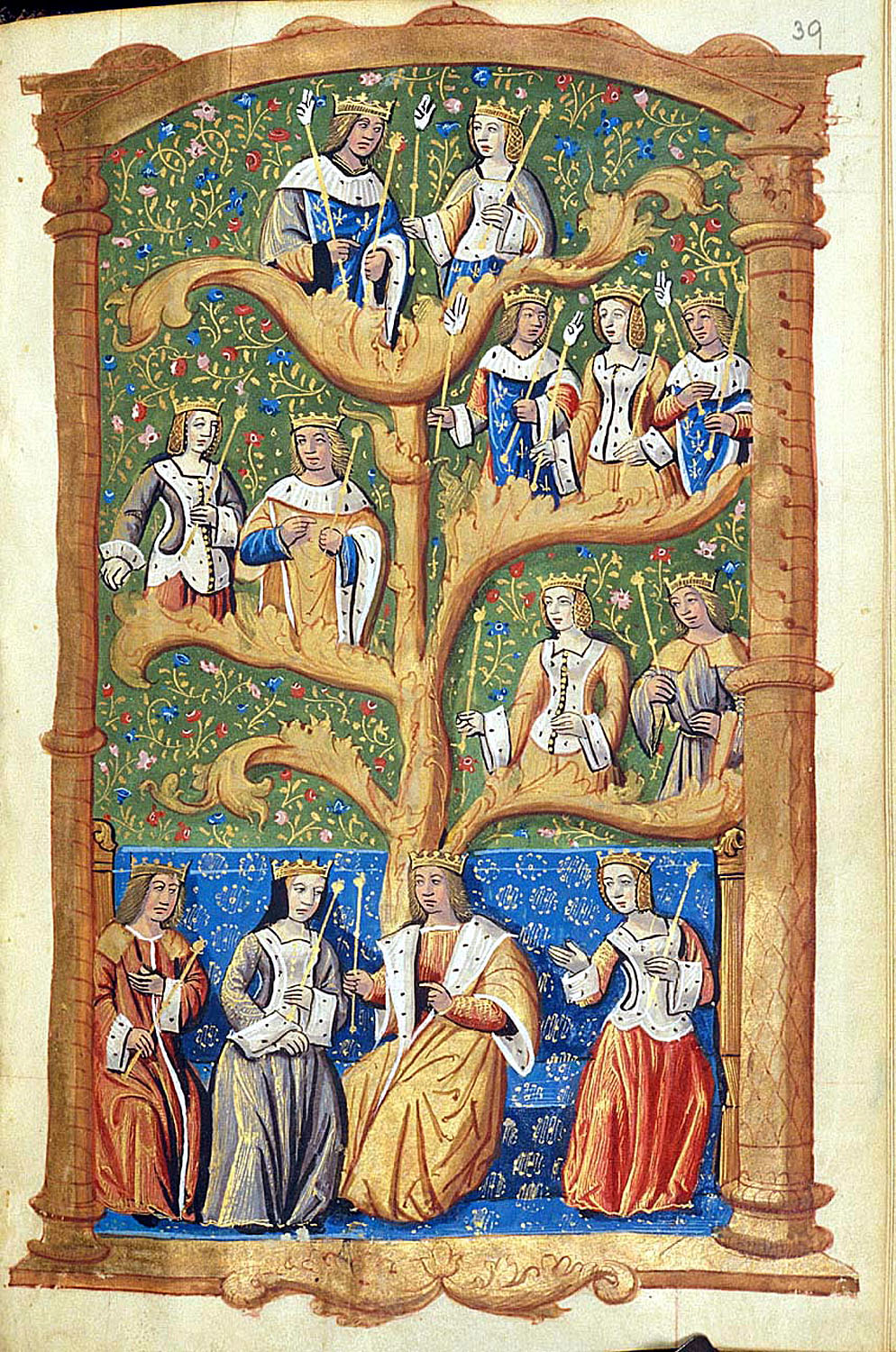
Le Sacre de Claude de France (Description of the coronation of Claude of France at St. Denis in 1517), tapestry illuminated by Jean Coene IV, c. 1517

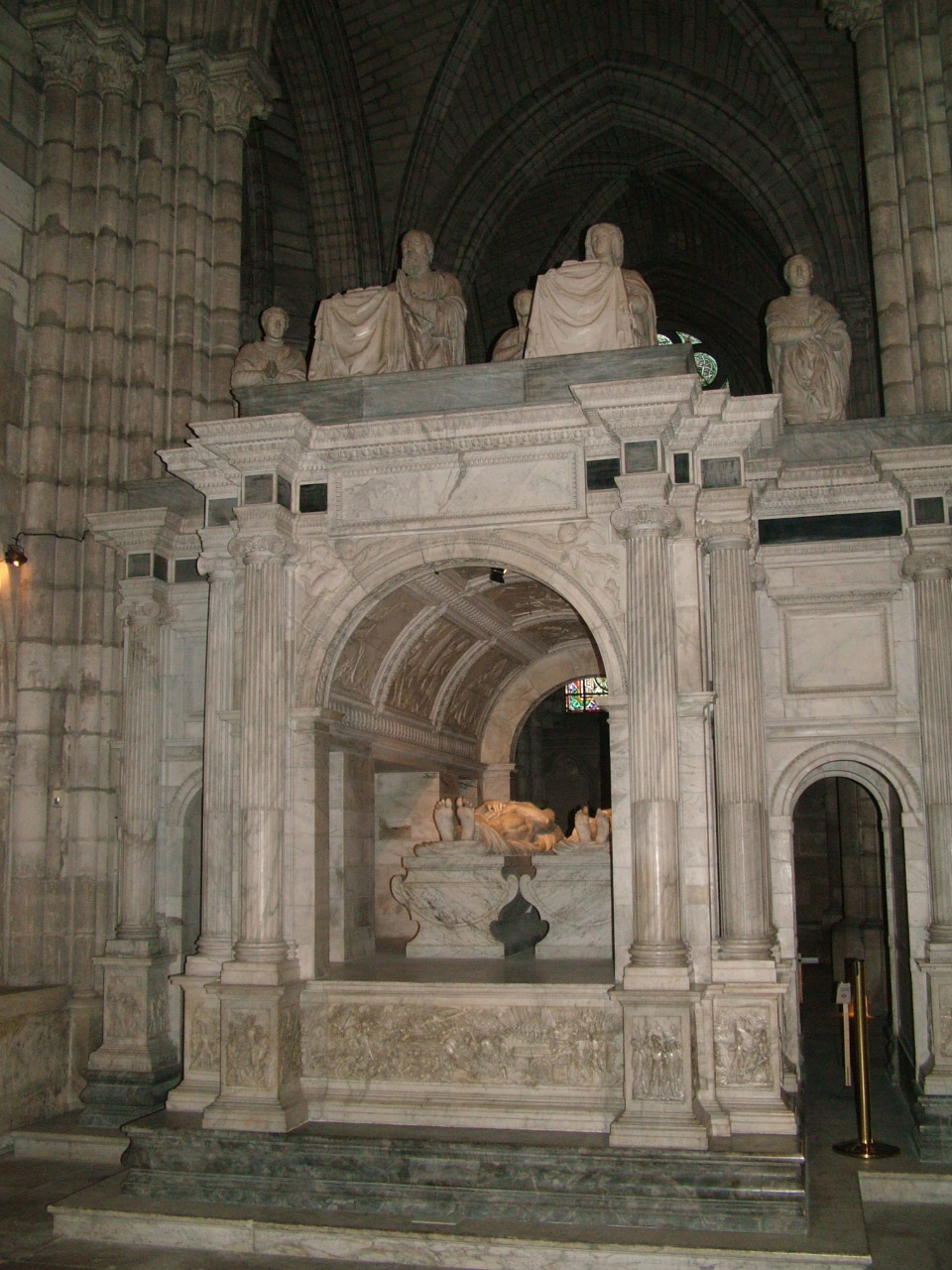
Tomb of Francis I and Claude of France at St. Denis Basilica

On 9 January 1514, when her mother died, Claude became Duchess of Brittany; and four months later, on 18 May, at the age of 14, she married her cousin Francis at Saint-Germain-en-Laye. With this union, it was secured that Brittany would remain united to the French crown, unless the third marriage of Louis with Mary of England (celebrated on 9 October 1514) produced the long-waited heir. However, the third marriage of Louis was short-lived and childless: Louis XII died on 1 January 1515, less than three months after the wedding. Francis and Claude became king and queen.

As Duchess of Brittany, Claude left all the affairs of the duchy to her spouse; she did, however, refuse his repeated suggestion to have Brittany incorporated into France, and instead named her oldest son, Francis, heir to the duchy.

=== Queen of France ===
As queen, Claude was eclipsed at court by her mother-in-law, Louise of Savoy, and her sister-in-law, the literary Navarrese queen Margaret of Angoulême. She never ruled over Brittany; in 1515 she gave the government of her domains to her husband in perpetuity. Unlike her younger sister Renée, she seems to have never showed any interest in her maternal inheritance nor had any disposition to politics, as she preferred to devote herself to religion under the influence, according to some sources, of Christopher Numar of Forlì, who was the confessor of her mother-in-law. Gabriel Miron repeated his functions under Anne of Brittany and remained as chancellor of Queen Claude and first doctor; he wrote a book entitled de Regimine infantium tractatus tres.

After Francis became king in 1515, Anne Boleyn stayed as a member of Claude's household. Renée of France later mentioned that she was one of Claude's maid of honour. It is assumed that Anne served as Claude's interpreter whenever there were English visitors, such as in 1520, at the Field of Cloth of Gold. Anne Boleyn returned to England in late 1521, where she eventually became Queen of England as the second wife of Henry VIII. Diane de Poitiers, another of Claude's ladies, was a principal inspiration of the School of Fontainebleau of the French Renaissance, and became the lifelong mistress of Claude's son, Henry II.

Claude was crowned Queen of France at St. Denis Basilica on 10 May 1517 by Cardinal Philippe de Luxembourg (also known as Cardinal du Mans), who "anointed her in the breast and forehead".

She spent almost all her marriage in an endless round of annual pregnancies. Her husband had many mistresses, but was usually relatively discreet. Claude imposed a strict moral code on her own household, which only a few chose to flout.

About Claude, the historian Brantôme wrote:

I must speak about madame Claude of France, who was very good and very charitable, and very sweet to everyone and never showed displeasure to anybody in her court or of her domains. She was deeply loved by the King Louis and the Queen Anne, her father and mother, and she was always a good daughter to them; after the King took the peaceful Duke of Milan, he made him declare and proclaim her in the Parliament of Paris the Duchess of the two most beautiful Duchies of Christendom, Milan and Brittany, one from the father and the other from the mother. What an heiress! if you please. Both Duchies joined in all good deed to our beautiful kingdom.

The pawn of so much dynastic maneuvering, Claude was short in stature and affected by scoliosis, which gave her a hunched back, while her husband was bigger and athletic. The successive pregnancies made her appear continuously plump, which drew mockeries at Court. Foreign ambassadors noted her "corpulence", claudication (tendency to limping), the strabismus affecting her left eye, her small size, and her ugliness, but they acknowledged her good qualities. She was little loved at court after the death of her parents. Brantôme testified:

That the king, her husband gave her the pox, which shortened her days. And madame the Regent [Louise of Savoy] bullied her constantly [...].

The king's will imposed the omnipresence of his mistress, Françoise de Foix.

=== Death ===
Claude died on 26 July 1524 (Note: Some historians state that Claude died on 20 July.) (Note: Peter Bietenholz states she died of pleurisy between 20 and 26 July 1524, while Glenn Richardson states she died sometime in July 1524.) at the Château de Blois, aged twenty-four. The exact cause of her death was disputed among sources and historians: while some alleged that she died in childbirth or after a miscarriage, others believed that she died for exhaustion after her many pregnancies or after developing bone tuberculosis (like her mother) and finally some believed that she died from syphilis caught from her husband. She was buried at St. Denis Basilica.

She was initially succeeded as ruler of Brittany by her eldest son, the Dauphin Francis, who became Duke Francis III, with Claude's widower King Francis I as guardian. After the Dauphin's death in 1536, Claude's second son, Henry, Duke of Orleans, became Dauphin and Duke of Brittany. He later became King of France as Henry II.

Claude's widowed husband himself remarried several years after Claude's death, to Eleanor of Austria, the sister of Emperor Charles V. The atmosphere at court became considerably more debauched, and there were rumours that King Francis' death in 1547 was due to syphilis.

== Physical appearance ==
Foreign ambassadors noted her "strong corpulence", her limp, the strabismus of her left eye, her short stature, her ugliness, and her reserve, but they also emphasized her good-hearted nature.

It has been speculated based on these descriptions that she had Down syndrome.

== Issue ==
Claude and Francis I had:

- Louise (19 August 1515 - 21 September 1518, aged three): died young, engaged to Charles I of Spain almost from birth until death.
- Charlotte (23 October 1516 - 8 September 1524, aged seven): died young, engaged to Charles I of Spain from 1518 until death.
- Francis (28 February 1518 - 10 August 1536, aged 18), who succeeded Claude as Duke of Brittany, but died unmarried and childless.
- Henry II (31 March 1519 - 10 July 1559, aged 40), who succeeded Francis I as King of France and married Catherine de' Medici, by whom he had issue.
- Madeleine (10 August 1520 - 2 July 1537, aged 16), who married James V of Scots and had no issue.
- Charles (22 January 1522 - 9 September 1545, aged 23), who died unmarried and childless.
- Margaret (5 June 1523 - 14 September 1574, aged 51), who married Emmanuel Philibert, Duke of Savoy, in 1559 and had issue.

== In popular culture ==
Claude appears as a character in the historical novel "The Serpent Garden" by Judith Merkle Riley. She is also depicted in The Tudors

== Sources ==
- Adams, Tracy; Adams, Christine (2022). "The "othering" of the ultimate insider: the queen of France". In Rohr, Zita Eva; Spangler, Jonathan W. (eds.). Significant Others: Aspects of Deviance and Difference in Premodern Court Cultures. Routledge. pp. 143–179.
- Baumgartner, Frederic J. (1996). Louis XII. New York: St. Martin's Press. ISBN 0312120729.
- Bietenholz, Peter G. (1995). "Claude, queen of France, 13 October 1494–c.20 July 1524". In Bietenholz, Peter G.; Deutscher, Thomas Brian (eds.). Contemporaries of Erasmus: A Biographical Register of the Renaissance and Reformation. Vol. 1–3. University of Toronto Press. pp. 305–306.
- Brown, Cynthia J. (2010). "Like Mother, Like Daughter: The Blurring of Royal Imagery in Books for Anne de Bretagne and Claude de France". In Brown, Cynthia Jane (ed.). The Cultural and Political Legacy of Anne de Bretagne: Negotiating Convention in Books and Documents. D.S. Brewer. pp. 101–122.
- Fraser, Antonia (1993). The Wives of Henry VIII. Knopf Doubleday Publishing Group.
- Ferguson, Gary; McKinley, Mary B., eds. (2013). "Introduction". A Companion to Marguerite de Navarre. Brill. pp. 1–28.
- Richardson, Glenn (2013). The Field of Cloth of Gold. Yale University Press.
- Wellman, Kathleen (2013). Queens and Mistresses of Renaissance France. Yale University Press.
- Wilson-Chevalier, Kathleen (2010). "Claude de France: In her Mother's Likeness, a Queen with Symbolic Clout?". In Brown, Cynthia Jane (ed.). The Cultural and Political Legacy of Anne de Bretagne: Negotiating Convention in Books and Documents. D.S. Brewer. pp. 123–146.

Claude of France House of Valois-Orléans Cadet branch of the Capetian dynasty Born: 13 October 1499 Died: 20 July 1524
French nobility
Preceded by Anne	Duchess of Brittany; 1514–1524 with Francis (1514 – 1515)	Succeeded by Francis III
Preceded by Anne	Countess of Étampes; 1514-1524	Vacant Title next held by John V
French royalty
Preceded by Mary of England	Queen consort of France; 1515–1524	Vacant Title next held by Eleanor of Austria
