= Charlotte of Valois =

French princess

Charlotte
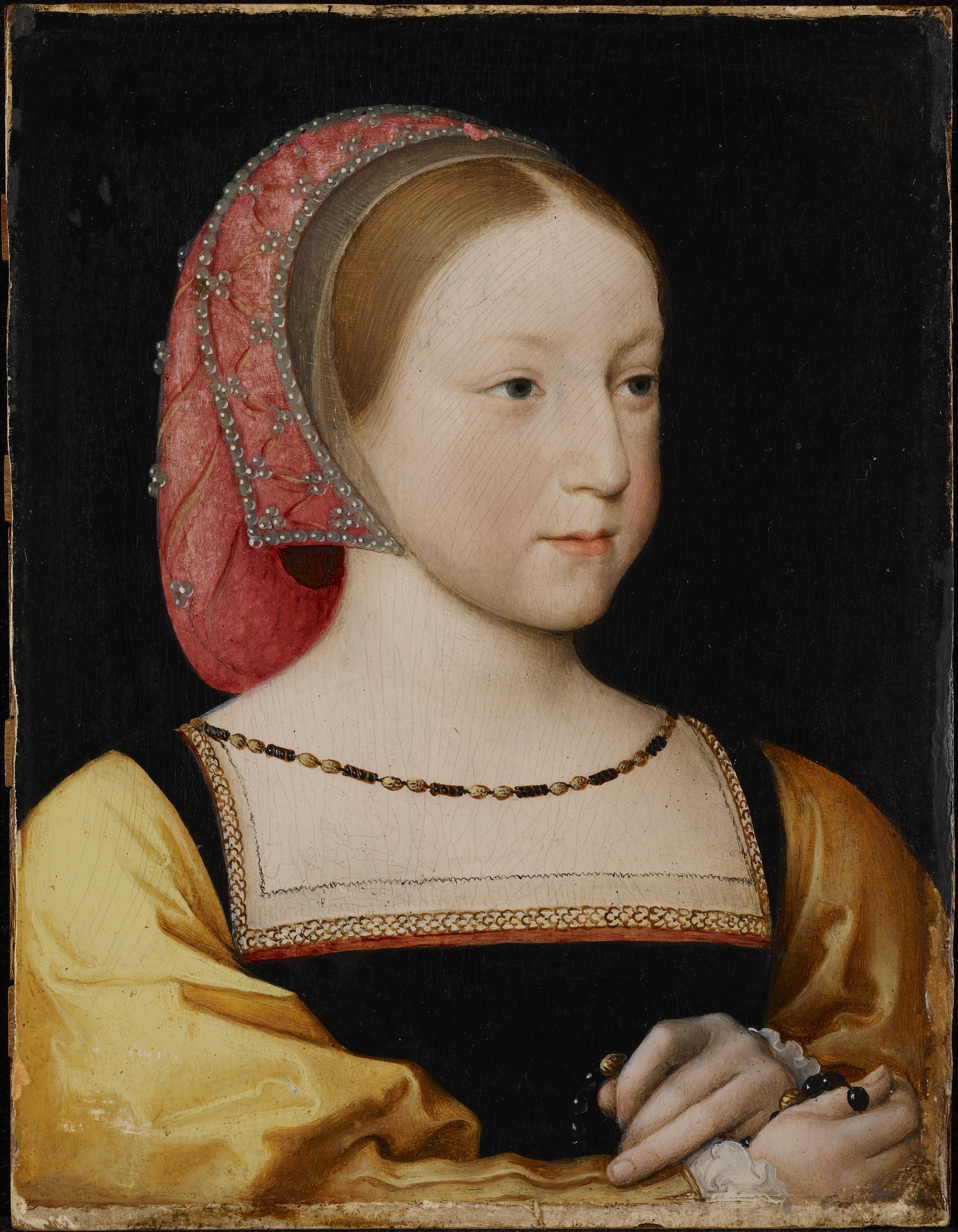
- Portrait by Jean Clouet, c. 1522
- Born: 23 October 1516; Château d'Amboise
- Died: 18 September 1524 (aged 7); Château de Saint-Germain-en-Laye
- Burial: Basilica of Saint-Denis
- House: Valois-Angoulême
- Father: Francis I of France
- Mother: Claude of France

Charlotte of France (23 October 1516 – 18 September 1524) was the second child and second daughter of the French King Francis I and his wife Queen Claude.

== Early life ==
Princess Charlotte was born on 23 October 1516 at the Château d'Amboise (in the Loire Valley in France) as the second daughter and child of King Francis I and Queen Claude. She had greenish blue eyes and bright red hair. She was one of the six children of the King and Queen that had red hair, a trait inherited from Anne of Brittany, the Queen's mother.

Following the death of her older sister Louise in 1518, Charlotte took her place as the fiancée of King Charles I of Spain (the later Holy Roman Emperor Charles V) under the Treaty of Noyon. The marriage would never be completed due to her early death.

== Later life and death ==
She lived a happy life. Before March 1519 she moved from the Château d'Amboise to the Château de Saint-Germain-en-Laye, where she remained for the rest of her short life. She had always been a delicate, frail child. At age seven, she contracted measles, the same disease which had killed her uncle, Charles Orlando, Dauphin of France, thirty years earlier. The only person who looked after her while she was sick was her aunt, Margaret of Angoulême, as her mother had already died two months earlier, her grandmother Louise of Savoy was very sick and her father was occupied by war. As he was later imprisoned, he was absent when his daughter died on 18 September 1524. Charlotte likely was very close to her aunt, who was heartbroken and distraught when her "little one" died.
