= Abel Foullon =

- Born: 1513; France
- Died: c. 1563–1565
- Occupations: Writer, Engineer, Director of the Mint
- Known for: Inventor of the holometer; patent specification "Usage & Description de l'holomètre"
- Spouse: Catherine Clouet
- Children: Benjamin Foullon (portrait painter and miniaturist)
- Relatives: Jean Clouet (father-in-law), François Clouet (brother-in-law)

Abel Foullon (1513–1563 or 1565, in France) was a writer, director of the Mint for Henry II of France and also an engineer to the king of France after Leonardo da Vinci. In 1545 he married Catherine Clouet, the daughter of the portrait painter Jean Clouet and sister of the portrait painter François Clouet. Their son Benjamin Foullon or Foulon also became a portrait painter and miniaturist.

== Invention and patenting of the holometer ==
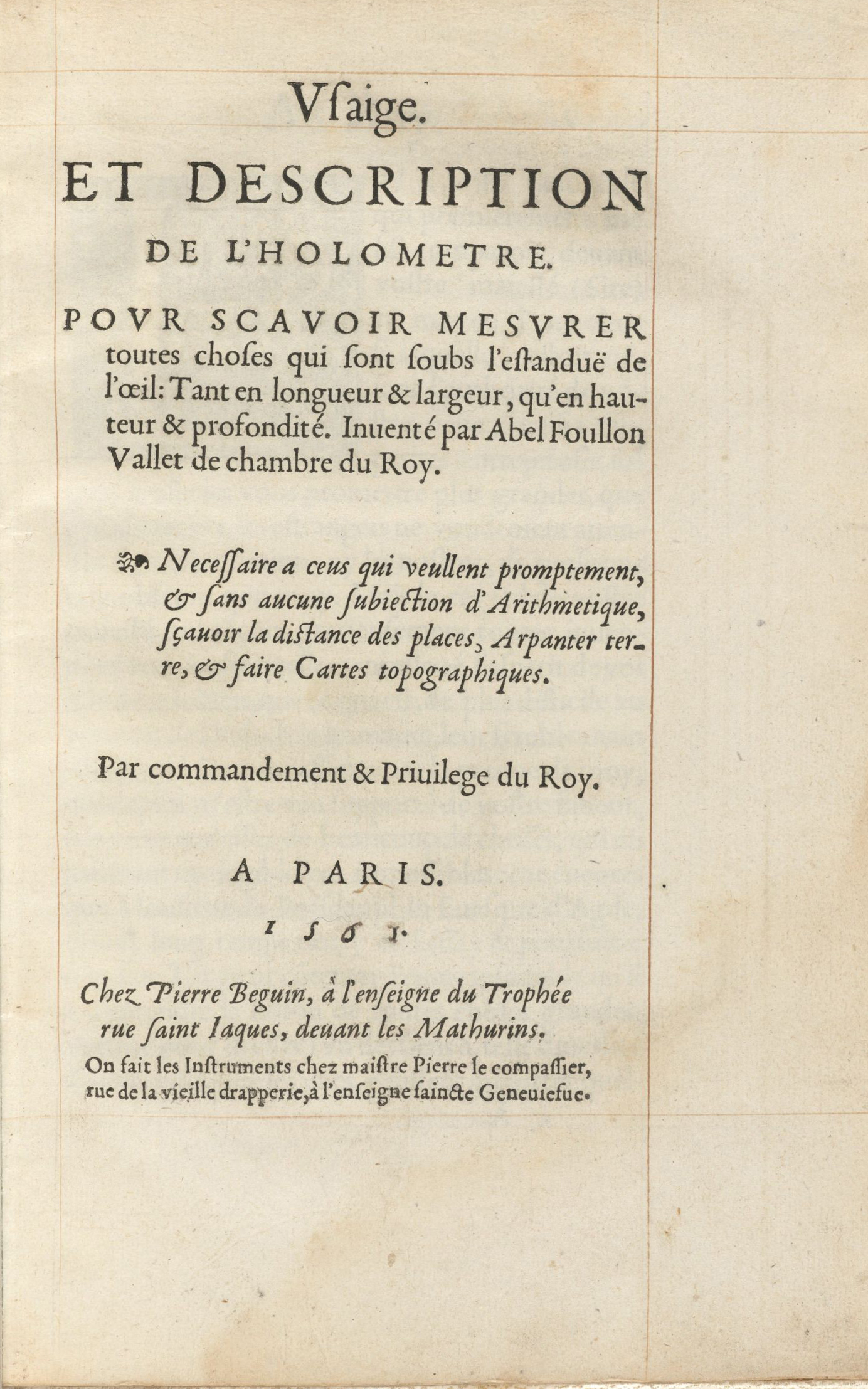
Usaige et description de l'holomètre, 1567

Foullon invented a holometre, an instrument for making of angular measurements for surveying. In 1551, Henry II granted Foullon a 10-year exclusive patent monopoly on the holometer in exchange for publishing a description of it. A description of an invention in a patent is called a patent “specification”. This first patent specification was entitled "Usage & Description de l'holomètre". Publication was delayed until after the patent expired in 1561.

== Bibliography ==
- Abel Foullon, Usage et description de l'holomètre, Paris: P. Béguin, 1567.
- Chevalier de Brunet-Varennes: Holometer, oder neues sehr genaues Instrument, um Zeichnungen in der Geometrie, so wie alle Zeichnungen nach der Perspectiv-Kunst zu erleichtern. 15 S. Mit 1 Taf. In: Polytechnisches Journal. Hrsg. J. G. Dingler. Bd. 34.; Erschienen: Stuttgart, Cotta, 1829.
