= Francis I of France =

King of France from 1515 to 1547

Francis I
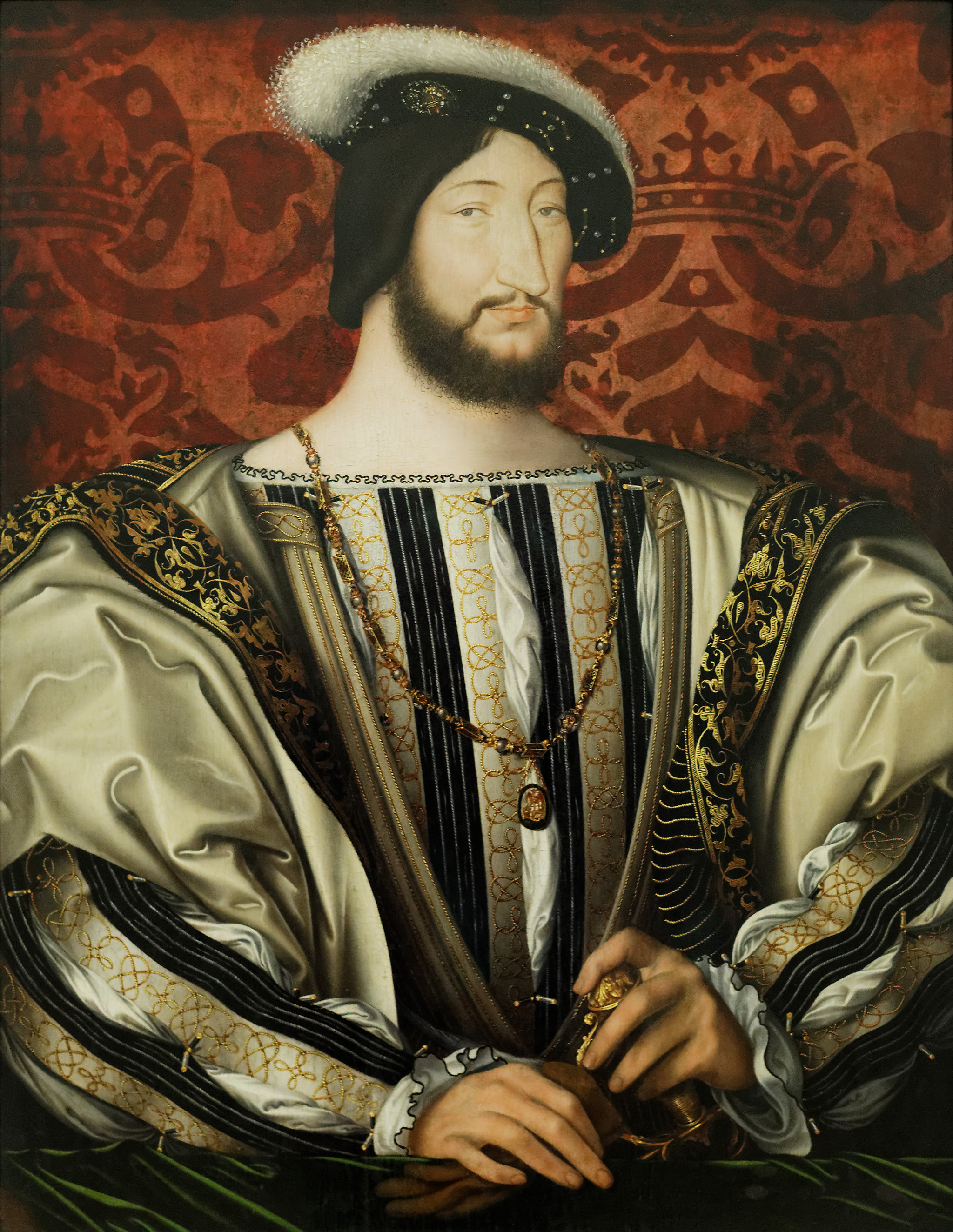
- Portrait c. 1527–30

King of France
- Reign: 1 January 1515 – 31 March 1547
- Coronation: 25 January 1515
- Predecessor: Louis XII
- Successor: Henry II

Duke of Milan
- Reign: 11 October 1515 – 20 November 1521
- Predecessor: Massimiliano Sforza
- Successor: Francesco II Sforza
- Born: Francis of Orléans; 12 September 1494; Château de Cognac, Cognac, France
- Died: 31 March 1547 (aged 52); Château de Rambouillet, Rambouillet, France
- Burial: 23 May 1547; Basilica of St Denis, France
- Spouses: Claude, Duchess of Brittany (m. 1514; died 1524) Eleanor of Austria (m. 1530)
- Issue more...: Louise of Valois; Charlotte of Valois; Francis III, Duke of Brittany; Henry II, King of France; Madeleine, Queen of Scots; Charles, Duke of Orléans; Margaret, Duchess of Savoy
- House: Valois-Angoulême
- Father: Charles, Count of Angoulême
- Mother: Louise of Savoy
- Religion: Catholicism

Francis I (French: François I^{er}; Middle French: Françoys; 12 September 1494 – 31 March 1547) was King of France from 1515 until his death in 1547. He was the son of Charles, Count of Angoulême, and Louise of Savoy. He succeeded his first cousin once removed and father-in-law Louis XII, who died without a legitimate son.

A patron of the arts, Francis promoted the emergent French Renaissance by attracting many Italian artists to work for him, including Leonardo da Vinci, who brought the Mona Lisa, which Francis had acquired. Francis's reign saw important cultural changes with the growth of central power in France, the spread of humanism and Protestantism, and the beginning of French exploration of the New World. Jacques Cartier and others claimed lands in the Americas for France and paved the way for the expansion of the first French colonial empire.

For his role in the development and promotion of the French language, Francis became known as le Père et Restaurateur des Lettres (the 'Father and Restorer of Letters'). He was also known as François au Grand Nez ('Francis of the Large Nose'), the Grand Colas, and the Roi-Chevalier (the 'Knight-King').

In keeping with his predecessors, Francis unsuccessfully continued the Italian Wars. The succession of his great rival Emperor Charles V to the Habsburg Netherlands and the throne of Spain, followed by the election of Charles as Holy Roman Emperor, led to France being geographically encircled by the Habsburg monarchy. In his struggle against Imperial hegemony, Francis sought the support of Henry VIII of England at the Field of the Cloth of Gold. After Francis was captured at the Battle of Pavia, he formed a Franco-Ottoman alliance with the Muslim sultan Suleiman the Magnificent, a controversial move for a Christian king at the time.

== Early life and accession ==
Francis of Orléans was born on 12 September 1494 at the Château de Cognac in the town of Cognac, which at that time lay in the province of Saintonge, a part of the Duchy of Aquitaine. Today the town lies in the department of Charente.

Francis was the only son of Charles of Orléans, Count of Angoulême, and Louise of Savoy, and a great-great-grandson of King Charles V of France. His family was not expected to inherit the throne, as his third cousin King Charles VIII was still young at the time of his birth, as was his father's cousin the Duke of Orléans, later King Louis XII. However, Charles VIII died childless in 1498 and was succeeded by Louis XII, who himself had no male heir. The Salic Law prevented women from inheriting the throne; therefore, the four-year-old Francis (who was already Count of Angoulême after the death of his own father two years earlier) became the heir presumptive to the throne of France in 1498 and was vested with the title of Duke of Valois.

In 1505, Louis XII, having fallen ill, ordered his daughter Claude and Francis to be married immediately, but only through an assembly of nobles were the two engaged. Claude was heir presumptive to the Duchy of Brittany through her mother, Anne of Brittany. Following Anne's death, the marriage took place on 18 May 1514. On 1 January 1515, Louis died, and Francis inherited the throne. He was crowned King of France in Reims Cathedral on 25 January 1515, with Claude as his queen consort.

== Reign ==
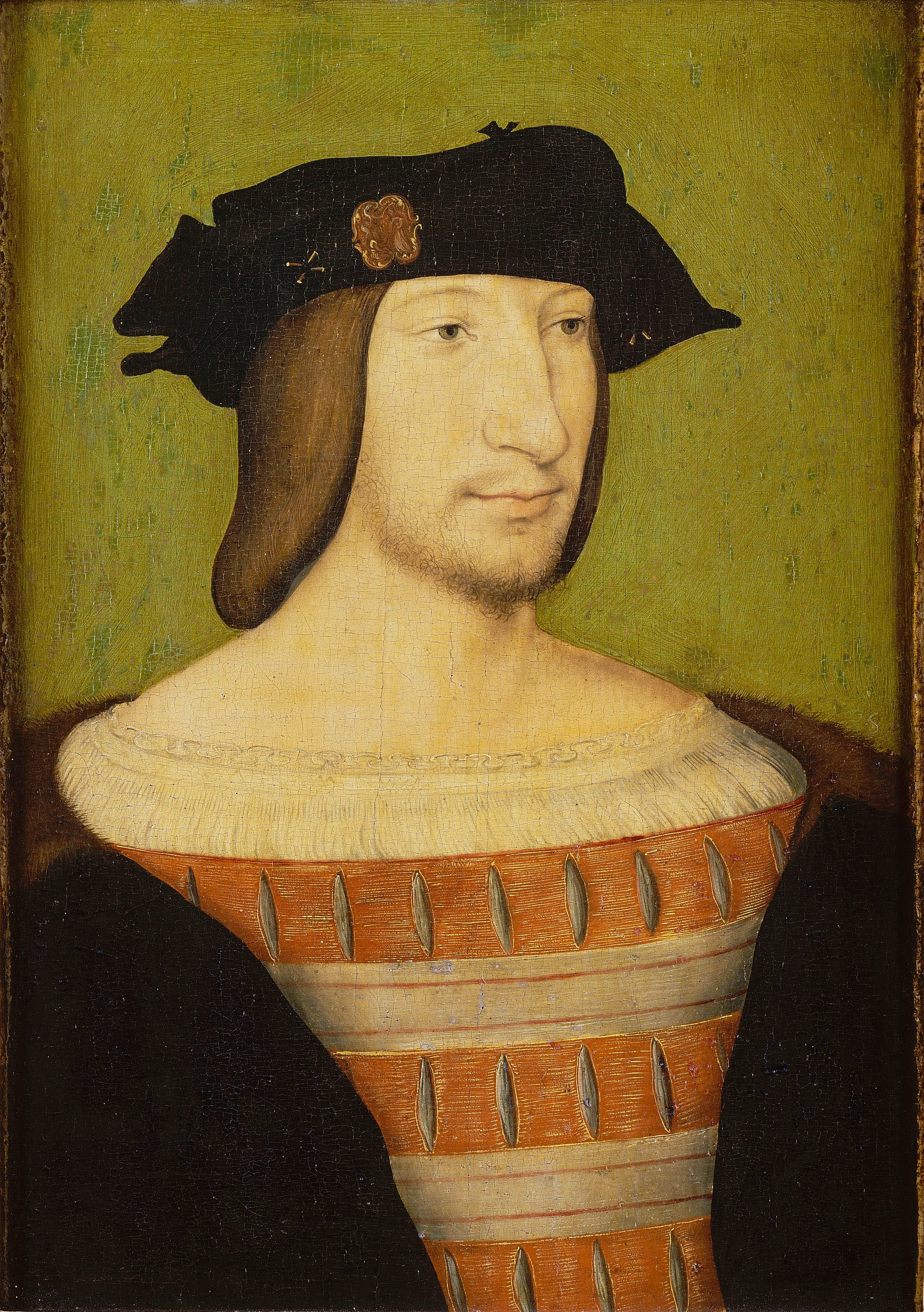
Francis I painted in 1515

As Francis was receiving his education, ideas emerging from the Italian Renaissance were influential in France. Some of his tutors, such as François de Moulins de Rochefort (his Latin instructor, who later during the reign of Francis was named Grand Aumônier de France) and Christophe de Longueil (a Brabantian humanist), were attracted by these new ways of thinking and attempted to influence Francis. His academic education had been in arithmetic, astronomy, geography, grammar, history, reading, spelling, and writing and he became proficient in Hebrew, Italian, Latin and Spanish. Francis came to learn chivalry, dancing, and music, and he loved archery, falconry, horseback riding, hunting, jousting, real tennis and wrestling. He ended up reading philosophy and theology and he was fascinated with art, literature, poetry and science. His mother, who admired Italian Renaissance art, passed this interest on to her son. Although Francis did not receive a humanist education, he was more influenced by humanism than any previous French king.

=== Patron of the arts ===
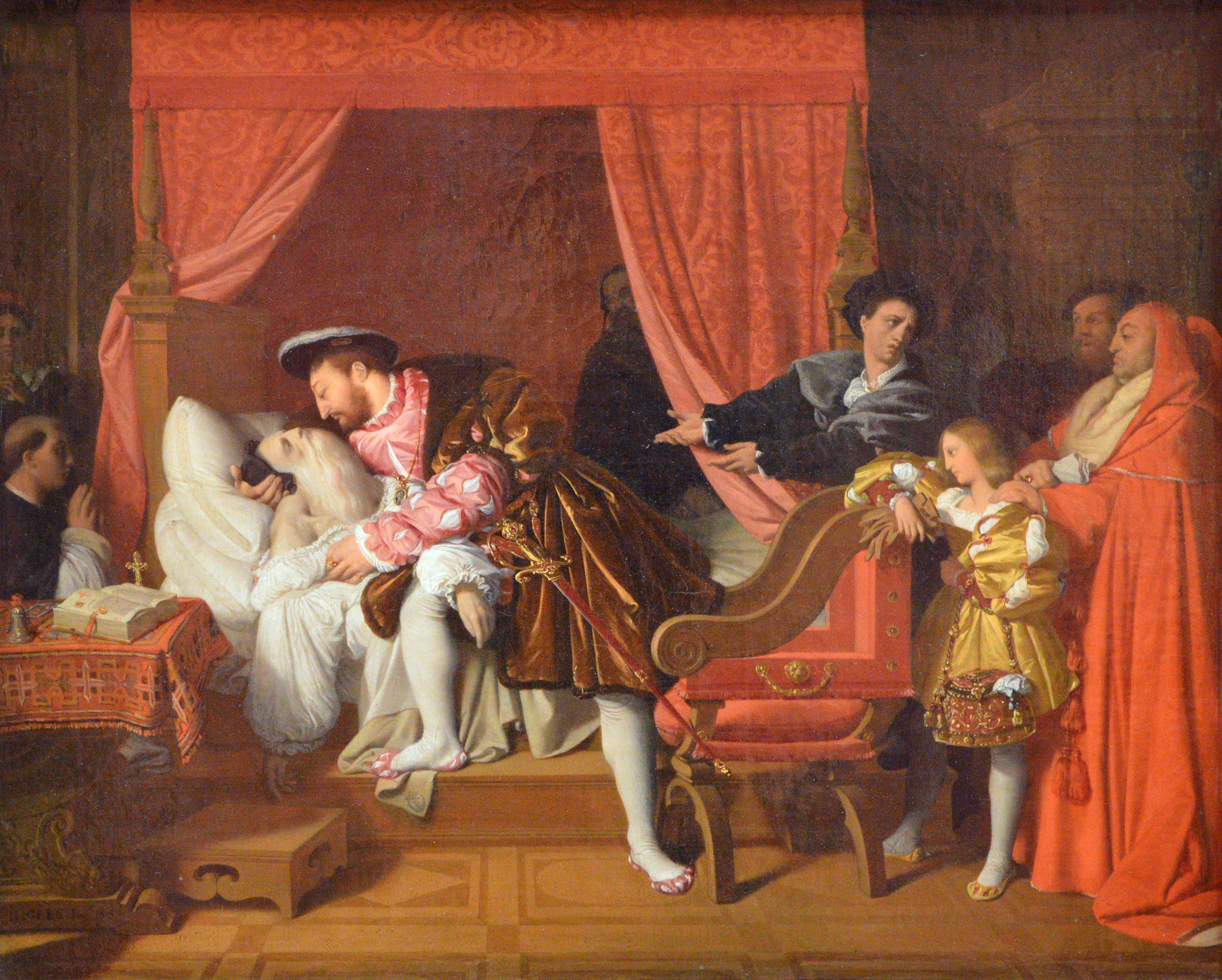
Francis I receiving the last breath of Leonardo da Vinci in 1519, by Ingres, painted in 1818

By the time he ascended the throne in 1515, the Renaissance had arrived in France, and Francis became an enthusiastic patron of the arts. At the time of his accession, the royal palaces of France were ornamented with only a scattering of great paintings, and not a single sculpture, neither ancient nor modern.

Francis patronized many great artists of his time, including Andrea del Sarto and Leonardo da Vinci, the latter of whom was persuaded to make France his home during his last years. While da Vinci painted very little during his years in France, he brought with him many of his greatest works, including the Mona Lisa (known in France as La Joconde), and these remained in France after his death. Other major artists to receive Francis's patronage included the goldsmith Benvenuto Cellini and the painters Rosso Fiorentino, Giulio Romano, and Primaticcio, all of whom were employed in decorating Francis's various palaces. He also invited architect Sebastiano Serlio, who enjoyed a fruitful late career in France. Francis also commissioned a number of agents in Italy to procure notable works of art and ship them to France.

=== Man of letters ===
Francis was also renowned as a man of letters. When he comes up in a conversation among characters in Baldassare Castiglione's Book of the Courtier, he is seen with a hope to bring culture to the war-obsessed French nation. Not only did Francis support a number of major writers of the period, but he was also a poet himself, if not one of particular ability. Francis worked diligently at improving the royal library. He appointed the French humanist Guillaume Budé as chief librarian and began to expand the collection. Francis employed agents in Italy to look for rare books and manuscripts, just as he had agents looking for artworks. During his reign, the size of the library greatly increased. Not only did he expand the library, but there is also evidence that he read the books he bought for it, a much rarer event in the royal annals. Francis set an important precedent by opening his library to scholars from around the world in order to facilitate the diffusion of knowledge.

In 1537, Francis signed the Ordonnance de Montpellier, which decreed that his library be given a copy of every book to be sold in France. Francis's older sister, Marguerite, Queen of Navarre, was an accomplished writer who produced the classic collection of short stories known as the Heptaméron. Francis corresponded with the abbesse and philosopher Claude de Bectoz, of whose letters he was so fond that he would carry them around and show them to the ladies of his court. Together with his sister, he visited her in Tarascon.

=== Construction ===
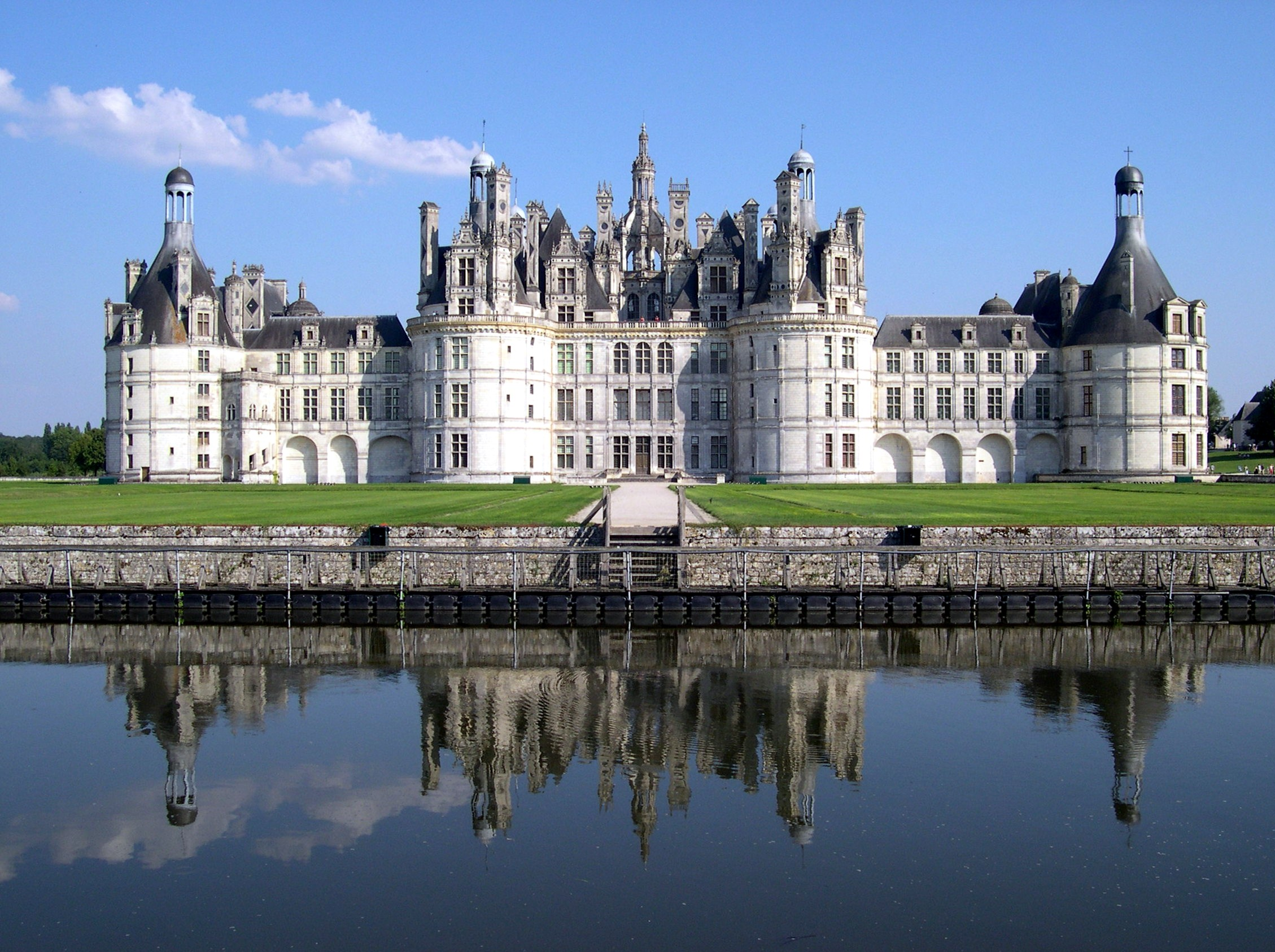
Francis's Château de Chambord displays a distinct French Renaissance architecture.

Francis poured vast amounts of money into new structures. He continued the work of his predecessors on the Château d'Amboise and also started renovations on the Château de Blois. Early in his reign, he began construction of the magnificent Château de Chambord, inspired by the architectural styles of the Italian Renaissance, and possibly designed by Leonardo da Vinci. Francis also rebuilt the Louvre Palace, transforming it from a medieval fortress into a building of Renaissance splendour. He financed the building of a new City Hall (the Hôtel de Ville) for Paris in order to have control over the building's design. He constructed the Château de Madrid in the Bois de Boulogne and rebuilt the Château de Saint-Germain-en-Laye. The largest of Francis's building projects was the reconstruction and expansion of the Château de Fontainebleau, which quickly became his favourite place of residence, as well as the residence of his official mistress, Anne, Duchess of Étampes.

=== Military action ===
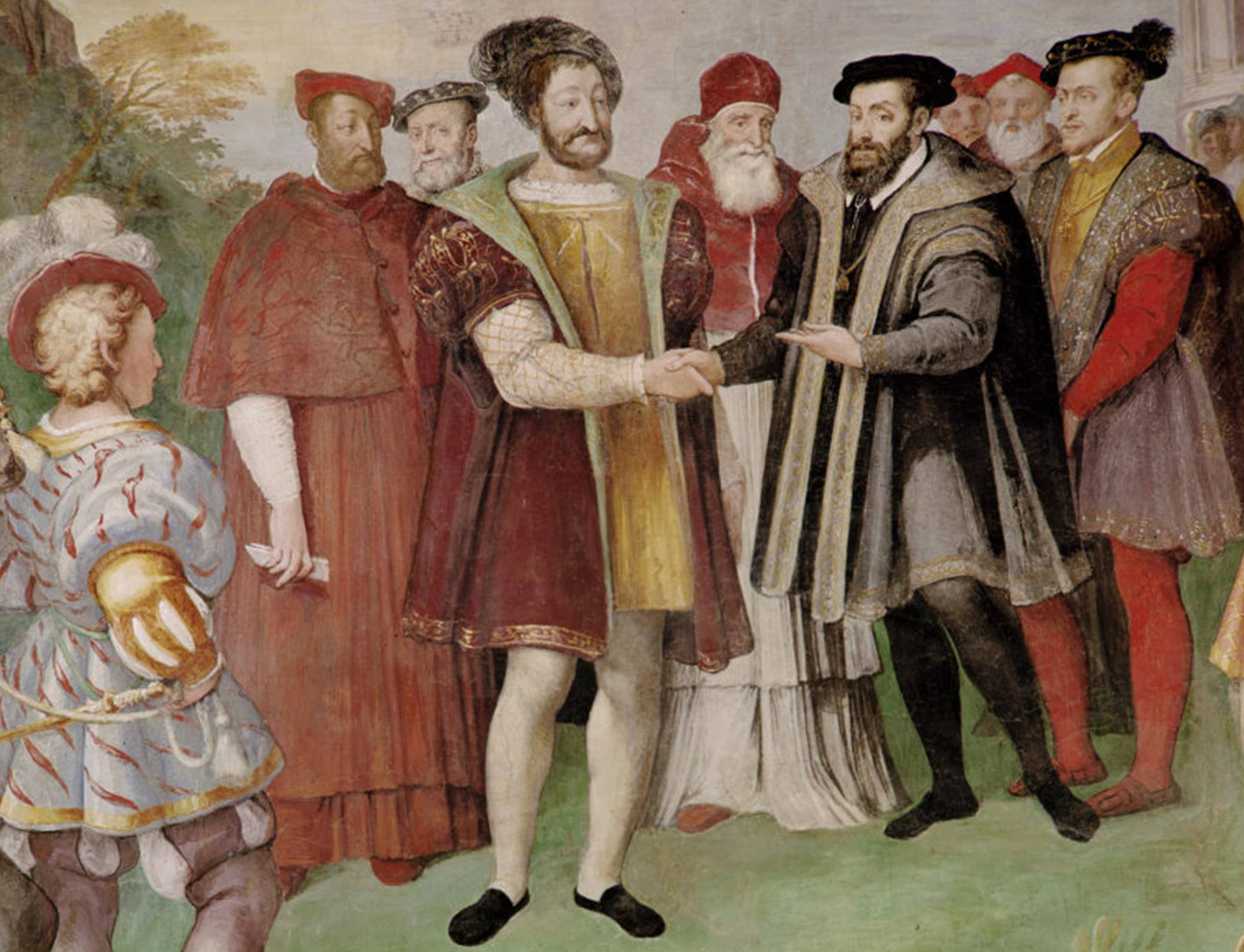
Francis I and Holy Roman Emperor Charles V made peace at the Truce of Nice in 1538. Francis I actually refused to meet Charles in person, and the treaty was signed in separate rooms.

Although the Italian Wars (1494–1559) came to dominate the reign of Francis I, which he constantly participated in at the forefront as le Roi-Chevalier, the wars were not the sole focus of his policies. He merely continued the wars that he succeeded from his predecessors and that his heir and successor on the throne, Henry II of France, would inherit after Francis's death. Indeed, the Italian Wars had begun when Milan sent a plea to King Charles VIII of France for protection against the aggressive actions of the King of Naples.

Much of the military activity of Francis's reign was focused on his sworn enemy, the Holy Roman Emperor Charles V. Francis and Charles maintained an intense personal rivalry. In addition to the Holy Roman Empire, Charles personally ruled Spain, Austria, and a number of smaller possessions neighbouring France, and was thus a constant threat to Francis I's kingdom.

Militarily and diplomatically, the reign of Francis I was a mixed bag of success and failure. Francis had tried and failed to become Holy Roman Emperor at the Imperial election of 1519, primarily due to his adversary Charles having threatened the electors with violence. There were also temporary victories, such as the portion of the Italian Wars called the War of the League of Cambrai (1508–1516), especially the final stage of the war, which history refers to simply as "Francis's First Italian War" (1515–1516). Francis routed the combined forces of the Papal States and the Old Swiss Confederacy at Marignano on 13–15 September 1515. This grand victory allowed Francis to capture the Italian city-state of Milan; however, in November 1521, during the Four Years' War, Francis was forced to abandon Milan in the face of the advancing Imperial forces of the Holy Roman Empire and open revolt within the duchy.

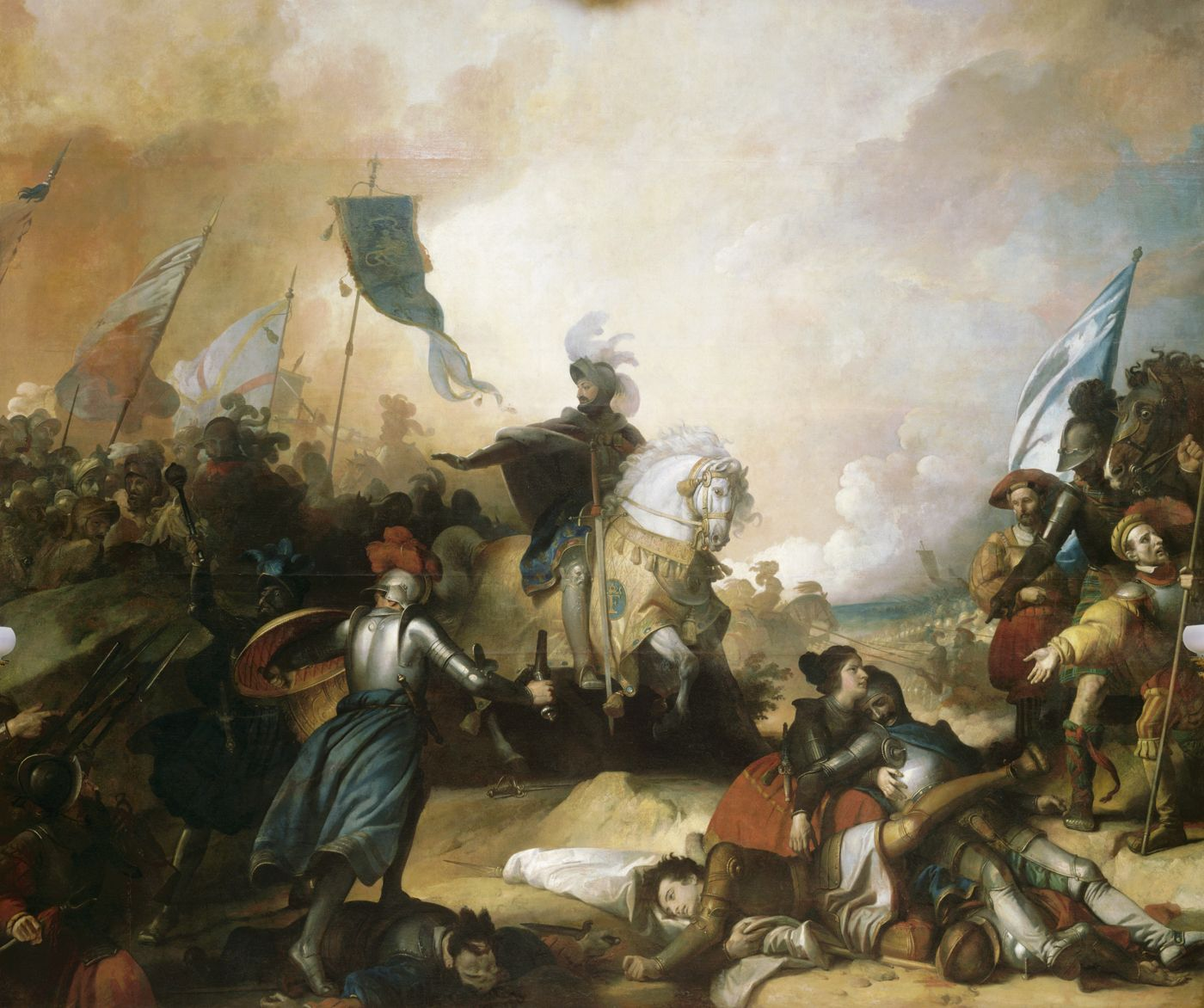
Francis I at the Battle of Marignano

Francis I attempted to arrange an alliance with Henry VIII at the famous meeting at the Field of Cloth of Gold on 7 June 1520, but despite a lavish fortnight of diplomacy they failed to reach an agreement. Francis and Henry VIII both shared the dreams of power and chivalric glory; however their relationship featured intense personal and dynastic rivalry. Francis was driven by his intense eagerness to retake Milan, despite the strong opposition of other powers. Henry VIII was likewise determined to recapture northern France, which Francis could not allow.

However, the situation was grave; Francis had to face not only the whole might of Western Europe, but also internal hostility in the form of Charles III de Bourbon, a capable commander who fought alongside Francis as his constable at the great battle of Marignano, but defected to Charles V after his conflict with Francis's mother over inheritance of Bourbon estates. Despite all this, the Kingdom of France still held the balance of power in its favour. Nevertheless, the defeat suffered from the cataclysmic battle of Pavia on 24 February 1525, during part of the continuing Italian Wars known as the Four Years' War upheaved the political ground of Europe. He was actually taken prisoner: Cesare Hercolani injured his horse, and Francis himself was subsequently captured by Charles de Lannoy. Some claim he was captured by Diego Dávila, Alonso Pita da Veiga, and Juan de Urbieta, from Guipúzcoa. For this reason, Hercolani was named "Victor of the battle of Pavia". Zuppa alla Pavese was supposedly invented on the spot to feed the captive king after the battle.

Francis was held captive in Madrid. In a letter to his mother, he wrote, "Of all things, nothing remains to me but honour and life, which is safe." This line has come down in history famously as "All is lost save honour." Francis was compelled to make major concessions to Charles in the Treaty of Madrid (1526), signed on 14 January, before he was freed on 17 March. An ultimatum from Ottoman Sultan Suleiman to Charles additionally played a role in his release. Francis was forced to surrender any claims to Naples and Milan in Italy. He was forced to recognise the independence of the Duchy of Burgundy, which had been part of France since the death of Charles the Bold in 1477. And finally, Francis was betrothed to Charles' sister Eleanor. Francis returned to France in exchange for his two sons, Francis and Henry, Duke of Orléans, the future Henry II of France, but once he was free he revoked the forced concessions as his agreement with Charles was made under duress. He also proclaimed that the agreement was void because his sons were taken hostage with the implication that his word alone could not be trusted. Thus he firmly repudiated it. A renewed alliance with England enabled Francis to repudiate the treaty of Madrid.

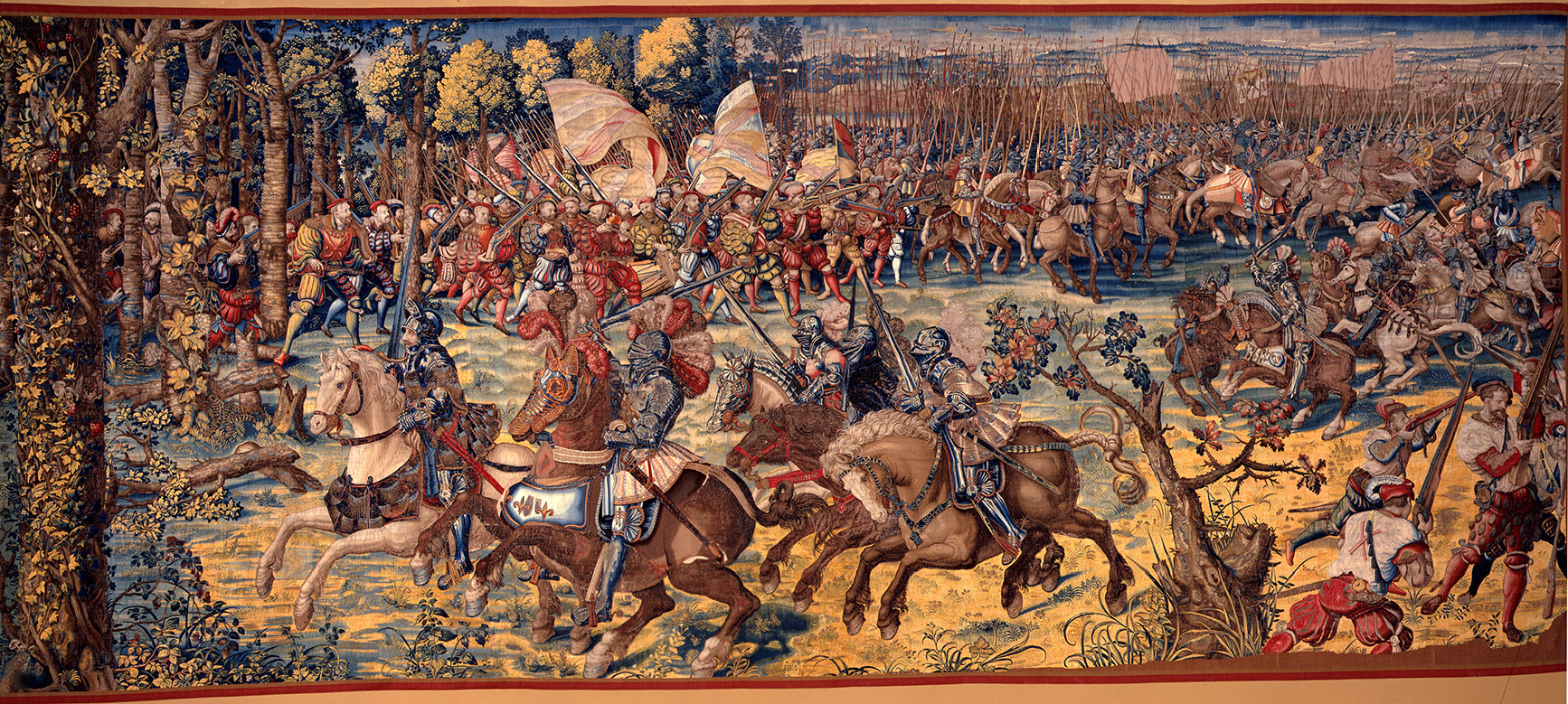
Detail of a tapestry depicting the Battle of Pavia, woven from a cartoon by Bernard van Orley (c. 1531)

Francis persevered in his rivalry against Charles and his intent to control Italy. By the mid-1520s, Pope Clement VII wished to liberate Italy from foreign domination, especially that of Charles, so he allied with Venice to form the League of Cognac. Francis joined the League in May 1526, in the War of the League of Cognac of 1526–30. Francis's allies proved weak, and the war was ended by the Treaty of Cambrai (1529; "the Peace of the Ladies", negotiated by Francis's mother and Charles' aunt). The two princes were released, and Francis married Eleanor.

On 24 July 1534, Francis, inspired by the Spanish tercios and the Roman legions, issued an edict to form seven infantry Légions of 6,000 troops each, of which 12,000 of the 42,000 were to be arquebusiers, testifying to the growing importance of gunpowder. The force was a national standing army, where any soldier could be promoted on the basis of vacancies, was paid wages by grade and granted exemptions from the taille and other taxes up to 20 sous, a heavy burden on the state budget.

After the League of Cognac failed, Francis concluded a secret alliance with Philip I, Landgrave of Hesse on 27 January 1534. This was directed against Charles on the pretext of assisting the Duke of Württemberg to regain his traditional seat, from which Charles had removed him in 1519. Francis also obtained the help of the Ottoman Empire and after the death of Francesco II Sforza, ruler of Milan, renewed the contest in Italy in the Italian War of 1536–1538. This round of fighting, which had little result, was ended by the Truce of Nice. The agreement collapsed, however, which led to Francis's final attempt on Italy in the Italian War of 1542–1546. Francis I managed to hold off the forces of Charles and Henry VIII, with Charles being forced to sign the Treaty of Crépy because of his financial difficulties and conflicts with the Schmalkaldic League.

=== Relations with the Americas and Asia ===
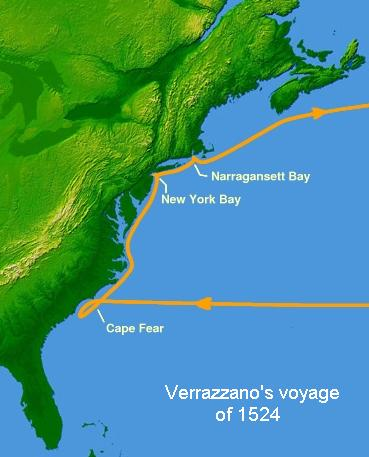
The voyage of Giovanni da Verrazzano in 1524

Francis had been much aggrieved at the papal bull Aeterni regis: in June 1481 Portuguese rule over Africa and the Indies was confirmed by Pope Sixtus IV. Thirteen years later, on 7 June 1494, Portugal and the Crown of Castile signed the Treaty of Tordesillas under which the newly discovered lands would be divided between the two signatories. All this prompted Francis to declare, "The sun shines for me as it does for others. I would very much like to see the clause of Adam's will by which I should be denied my share of the world."

In order to counterbalance the power of the Habsburg Empire under Charles V, especially its control of large parts of the New World through the Crown of Spain, Francis endeavoured to develop contacts with the New World and Asia. Fleets were sent to the Americas and the Far East, and close contacts were developed with the Ottoman Empire permitting the development of French Mediterranean trade as well as the establishment of a strategic military alliance.

The port city now known as Le Havre was founded in 1517 during the early years of Francis's reign. The construction of a new port was urgently needed in order to replace the ancient harbours of Honfleur and Harfleur, whose utility had decreased due to silting. Le Havre was originally named Franciscopolis after the king who founded it, but this name did not survive into later reigns.

==== Americas ====
In 1524, Francis assisted the citizens of Lyon in financing the expedition of Giovanni da Verrazzano to North America. On this expedition, Verrazzano visited the present site of New York City, naming it New Angoulême, and claimed Newfoundland for the French crown. Verrazzano's letter to Francis of 8 July 1524 is known as the Cèllere Codex.

In 1531, Bertrand d'Ornesan tried to establish a French trading post at Pernambuco, Brazil.

In 1534, Francis sent Jacques Cartier to explore the St. Lawrence River in Quebec to find "certain islands and lands where it is said there must be great quantities of gold and other riches". In 1541, Francis sent Jean-François de Roberval to settle Canada and to provide for the spread of "the Holy Catholic faith."

==== Asia ====
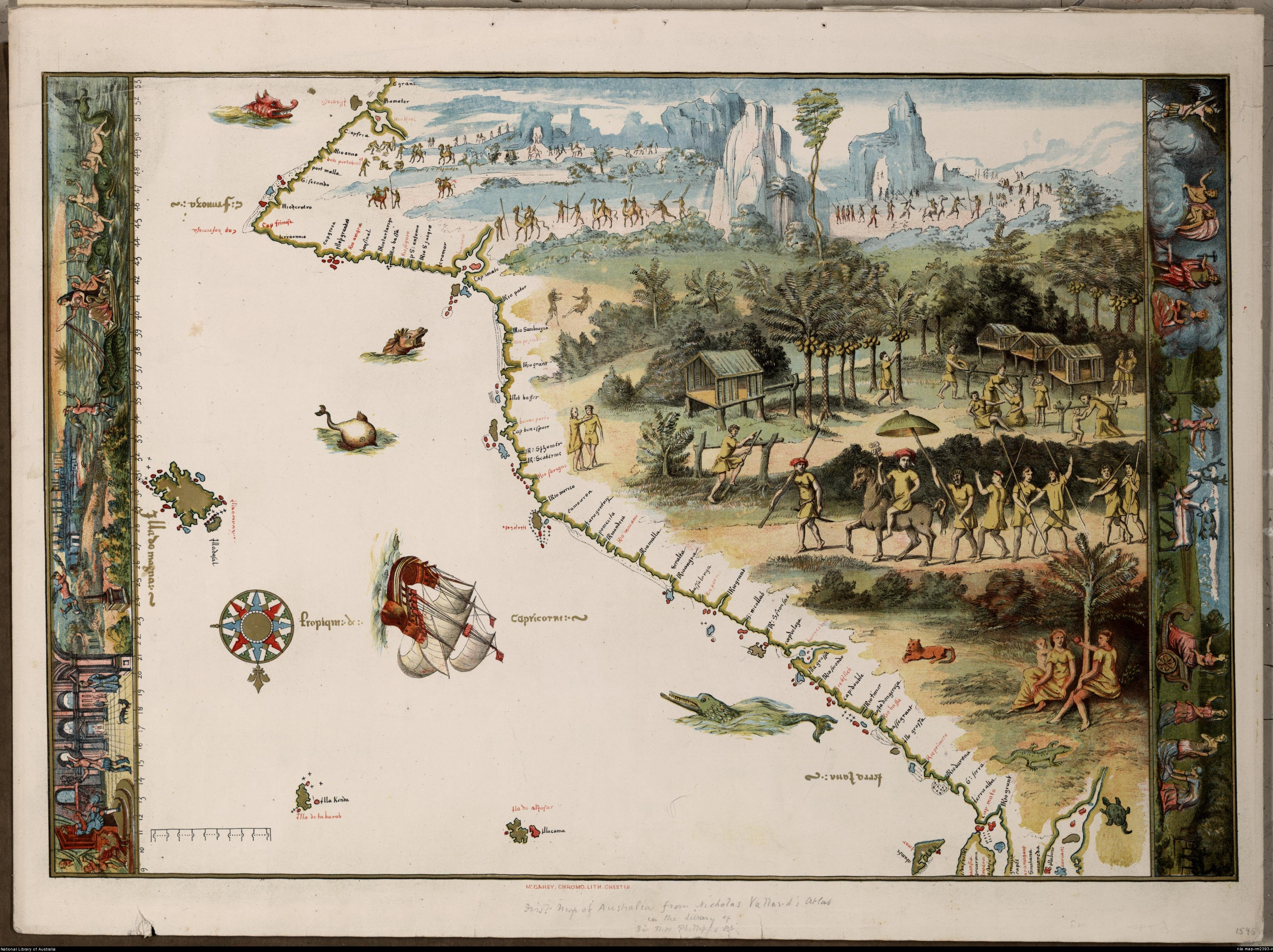
An example of the Dieppe maps showing Sumatra. Nicholas Vallard, 1547

French trade with East Asia was initiated during the reign of Francis I with the help of shipowner Jean Ango. In July 1527, a French Norman trading ship from the city of Rouen is recorded by the Portuguese João de Barros as having arrived in the Indian city of Diu. In 1529, Jean Parmentier, on board the Sacre and the Pensée, reached Sumatra. Upon its return, the expedition triggered the development of the Dieppe maps, influencing the work of Dieppe cartographers such as Jean Rotz.

==== Ottoman Empire ====
Under the reign of Francis I, France became the first country in Europe to establish formal relations with the Ottoman Empire and to set up instruction in the Arabic language under the guidance of Guillaume Postel at the Collège de France.

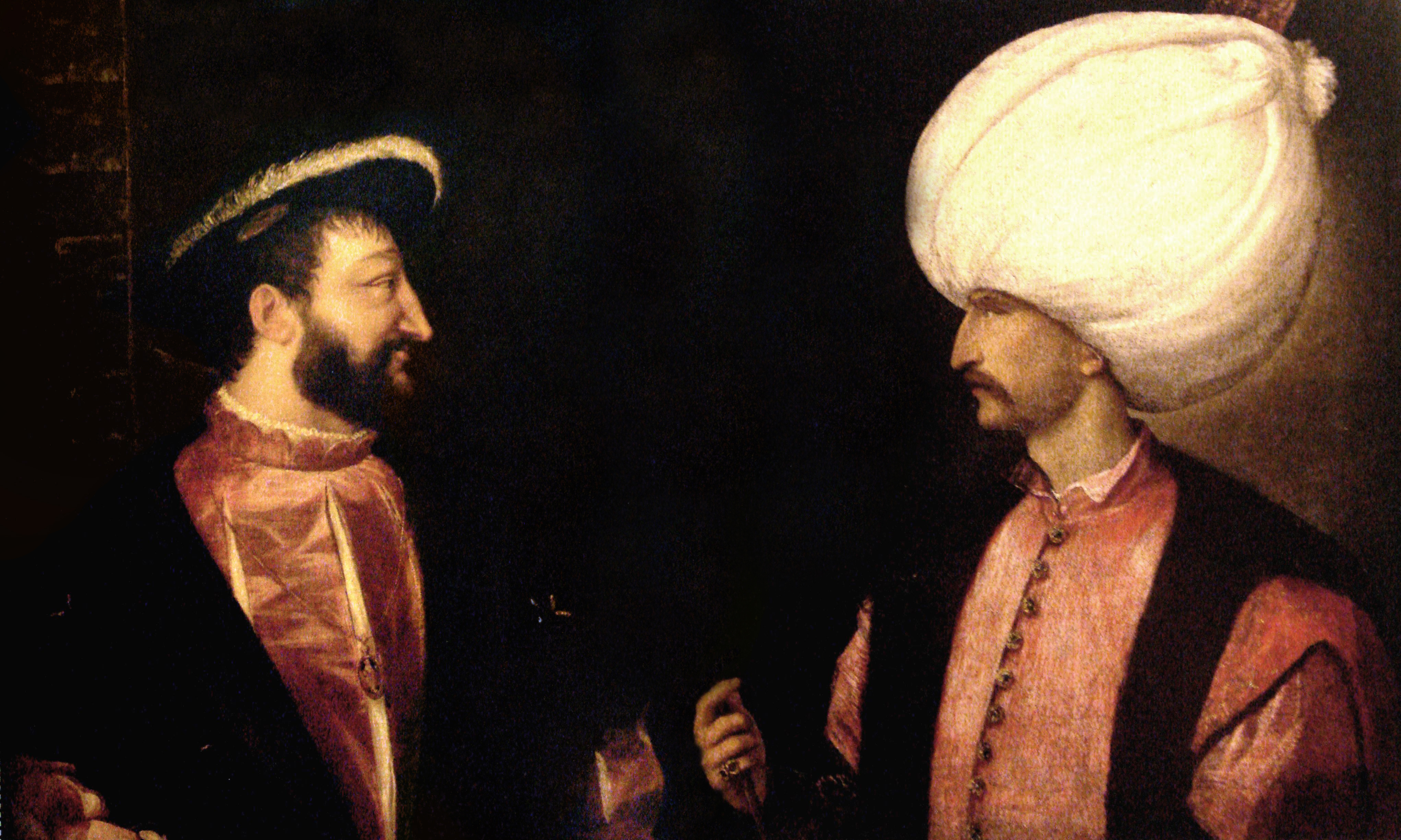
Francis I (left) and Suleiman the Magnificent (right) initiated a Franco-Ottoman alliance. Both were separately painted by Titian c. 1530.

In a watershed moment in European diplomacy, Francis came to an understanding with the Ottoman Empire that developed into a Franco-Ottoman alliance. The objective for Francis was to find an ally against the House of Habsburg. The pretext used by Francis was the protection of the Christians in Ottoman lands. The alliance has been called "the first nonideological diplomatic alliance of its kind between a Christian and non-Christian empire". It did, however, cause quite a scandal in the Christian world and was designated "the impious alliance", or "the sacrilegious union of the [French] Lily and the [Ottoman] Crescent." Nevertheless, it endured for many years, since it served the objective interests of both parties. The two powers colluded against Charles V, and in 1543 they even combined for a joint naval assault in the siege of Nice.

In 1533, Francis I sent colonel Pierre de Piton as ambassador to Morocco, initiating official France–Morocco relations. In a letter to Francis I dated 13 August 1533, the Wattassid ruler of Fez, Ahmed ben Mohammed, welcomed French overtures and granted freedom of shipping and protection of French traders.

=== Bureaucratic reform and language policy ===
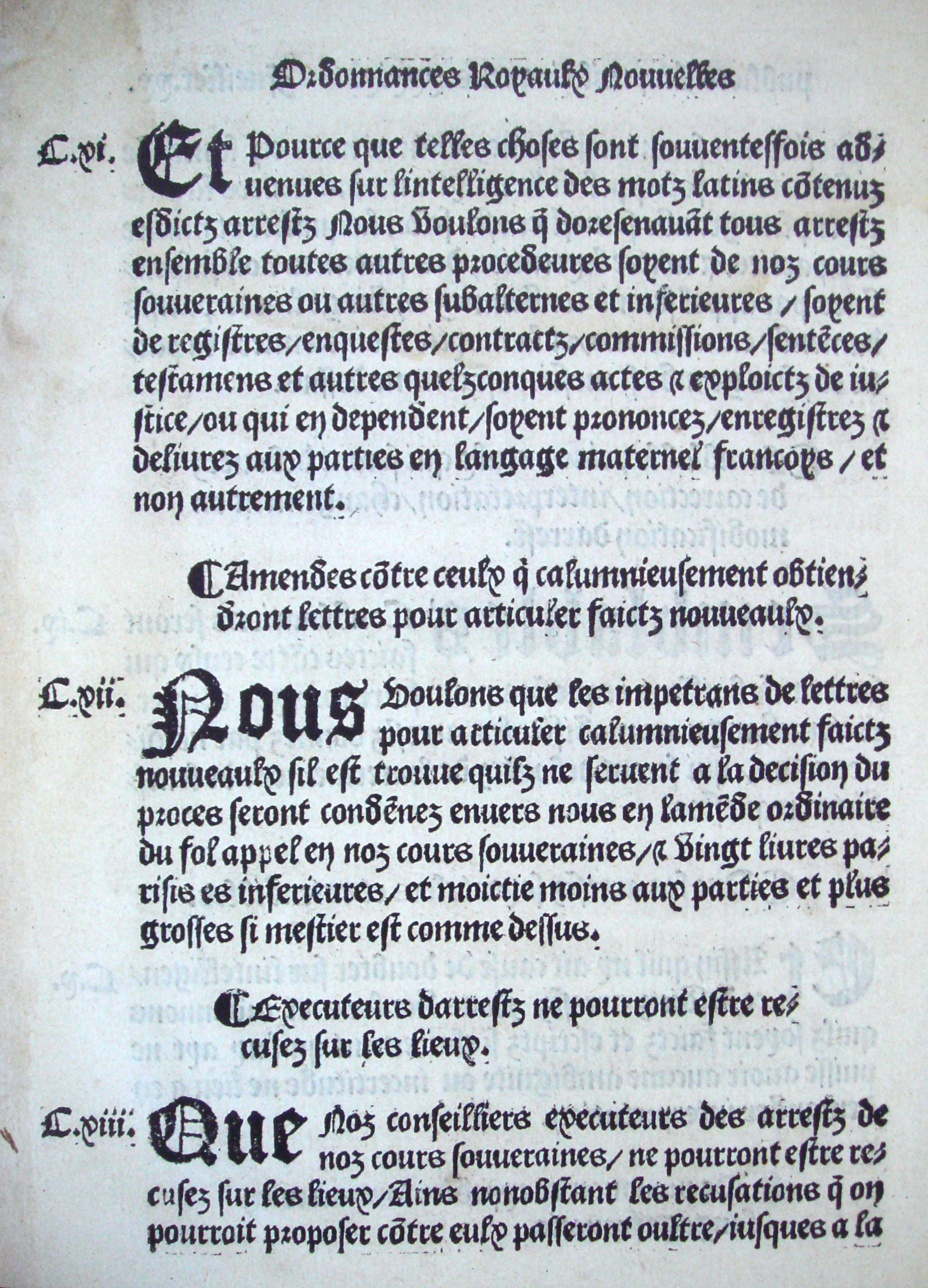
The Ordinance of Villers-Cotterêts in August 1539 prescribed the use of French in official documents.

Francis took several steps to eradicate the monopoly of Latin as the language of knowledge. In 1530, he declared French the national language of the kingdom, and that same year opened the Collège des trois langues, or Collège Royal, following the recommendation of humanist Guillaume Budé. Students at the Collège could study Greek, Hebrew and Aramaic, then Arabic under Guillaume Postel beginning in 1539.

In 1539, in his castle in Villers-Cotterêts, Francis signed the important edict known as Ordinance of Villers-Cotterêts, which, among other reforms, made French the administrative language of the kingdom as a replacement for Latin. This same edict required priests to register births, marriages, and deaths, and to establish a registry office in every parish. This initiated the first records of vital statistics with filiations available in Europe.

=== Religious policies ===
Divisions in Christianity in Western Europe during Francis's reign created lasting international rifts. Martin Luther's preaching and writing sparked the Protestant Reformation, which spread through much of Europe, including France.

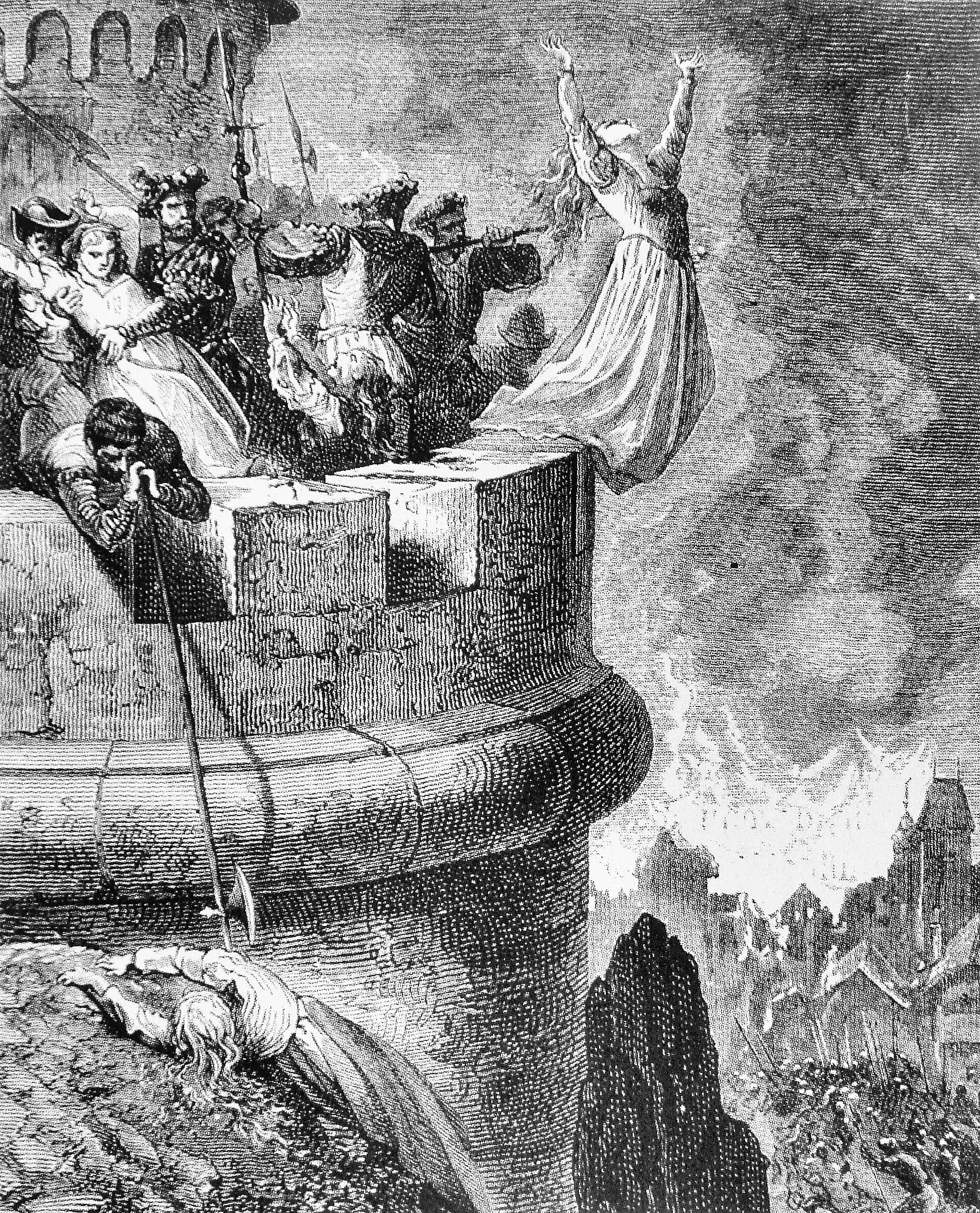
Massacre of Mérindol in 1545

Initially, Francis was relatively tolerant of the new movement, despite burning several heretics at the Place Maubert in 1523. He was influenced by his beloved sister Marguerite de Navarre, who was genuinely attracted by Luther's theology. Francis even considered it politically useful, as it caused many German princes to turn against his enemy Charles V.

Francis's attitude towards Protestantism changed for the worse following the "Affair of the Placards", on the night of 17 October 1534, in which notices appeared on the streets of Paris and other major cities denouncing the Catholic mass. The most fervent Catholics were outraged by the notice's allegations. Francis himself came to view the movement as a plot against him and began to persecute its followers. Protestants were jailed and executed. In some areas, whole villages were destroyed. In Paris, after 1540, Francis had heretics such as Étienne Dolet tortured and burned. Printing was censored and leading Protestant Reformers such as John Calvin were forced into exile. The persecutions soon numbered thousands of dead and tens of thousands of homeless.

Persecutions against Protestants were codified in the Edict of Fontainebleau issued by Francis. Major acts of violence continued, as when Francis ordered the extirpation of one of the historical pre-Lutheran groups, the Waldensians, at the Massacre of Mérindol in 1545.

=== Death ===
Francis died at the Château de Rambouillet on 31 March 1547, on his son and successor's 28th birthday. It is said that "he died complaining about the weight of a crown that he had first perceived as a gift from God". He was interred with his first wife, Claude, Duchess of Brittany, in Saint Denis Basilica. He was succeeded by his son, Henry II.

Francis's tomb and that of his wife and mother, along with the tombs of other French kings and members of the royal family, were desecrated on 20 October 1793 during the Reign of Terror at the height of the French Revolution.

=== Image and reputation ===
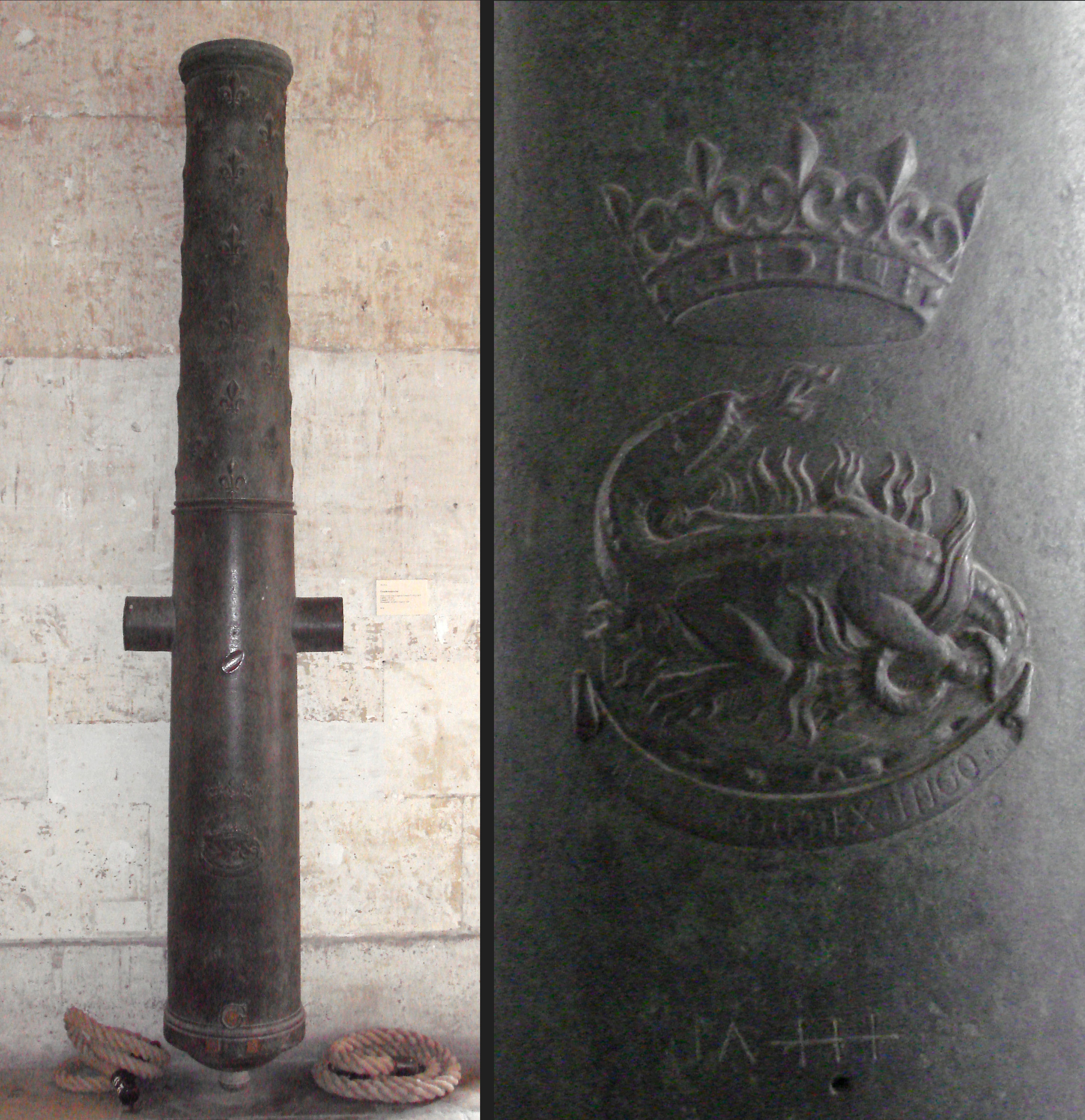
Grand culverin of Francis I, with his emblem and motto. A gift to his Ottoman allies recovered in Algiers in 1830. Musée de l'Armée

Francis I has a poor reputation in France; his 500th birthday was little noted in 1994. Popular and scholarly historical memory ignores his contributions to architecture, his art collection, and his patronage of scholars and artists. He is seen as a playboy who disgraced France by allowing himself to be defeated and taken prisoner at Pavia. The historian Jules Michelet set the negative image of Francis' reign.

Francis's personal emblem was the salamander and his Latin motto was Nutrisco et extinguo ("I nourish [the good] and extinguish [the bad]"). His long nose earned him the nickname François du Grand Nez ('Francis of the Big Nose'), and he was also colloquially known as the Grand Colas or Bonhomme Colas. For his personal involvement in battles, he was known as le Roi-Chevalier ('the Knight-King') or le Roi-Guerrier ('the Warrior-King').

British historian Glenn Richardson considers Francis a success:

He was a king who ruled as well as reigned. He knew the importance of war and a high international profile in staking his claim to be a great warrior-king of France. In battle, he was brave, if impetuous, which led equally to triumph and disaster. Domestically, Francis exercised the spirit and letter of the royal prerogative to its fullest extent. He bargained hard over taxation and other issues with interest groups, often by appearing not to bargain at all. He enhanced royal power and concentrated decision-making in a tight personal executive but used a wide range of offices, gifts and his own personal charisma to build up an elective personal affinity among the ranks of the nobility upon whom his reign depended .... Under Francis, the court of France was at the height of its prestige and international influence during the 16th century. Although opinion has varied considerably over the centuries since his death, his cultural legacy to France, to its Renaissance, was immense and ought to secure his reputation as among the greatest of its kings.

== Marriages and issue ==
On 18 May 1514, Francis married his second cousin Claude, the daughter of King Louis XII and Duchess Anne of Brittany. The couple had seven children:

1. Louise (19 August 1515 – 21 September 1518): died young; engaged to Charles I of Spain almost from birth until death.
2. Charlotte (23 October 1516 – 8 September 1524): died young; engaged to Charles I of Spain from 1518 until death.
3. Francis (28 February 1518 – 10 August 1536): succeeded his mother Claude as Duke of Brittany, but died aged 18, unmarried and childless.
4. Henry II (31 March 1519 – 10 July 1559): succeeded his father Francis I as King of France and his brother Francis as Duke of Brittany. Married Catherine de' Medici and had issue.
5. Madeleine (10 August 1520 – 2 July 1537): married James V of Scotland and had no issue.
6. Charles (22 January 1522 – 9 September 1545): died unmarried and childless.
7. Margaret (5 June 1523 – 14 September 1574): married Emmanuel Philibert, Duke of Savoy and had issue.

On 4 July 1530, Francis I married his second wife Eleanor of Austria, Queen (widow) of Portugal and the sister of Emperor Charles V. The couple had no children.

During his reign, Francis kept two official mistresses at court, and he was the first king to officially give the title of "maîtresse-en-titre" to his favorite mistress. The first was Françoise de Foix, Countess of Châteaubriant. In 1526, she was replaced by the blonde-haired, cultured Anne de Pisseleu d'Heilly, Duchess of Étampes, who, with the death of Queen Claude two years earlier, wielded far more political power at court than her predecessor had done. Another of his earlier mistresses was allegedly Mary Boleyn, mistress of King Henry VIII and sister of Henry's future wife, Anne Boleyn.

With Jacquette de Lanssac he was reputed to have had the following illegitimate child:

- Louis de Saint-Gelais (1512/1513–1593) married first Jeanne de La Roche-Andry and then Gabrielle de Rochechouart with issue.

== Portrayals ==
Francis was the subject of several portraits. A 1525–30 work by Jean Clouet is now housed at the Louvre in Paris. A portrait dated to 1532–33 by Joos van Cleve may have been commissioned either for the occasion of a meeting with Henry VIII of England or Francis's second marriage. The workshop of van Cleve produced copies of this work to be distributed to other courts.

The amorous exploits of Francis inspired the 1832 play by Fanny Kemble, Francis the First, and the 1832 play by Victor Hugo, Le Roi s'amuse ("The King's Amusement"), which featured the jester Triboulet, the inspiration for the 1851 opera Rigoletto by Giuseppe Verdi. Francis was first played in the Georges Méliès short François I^{er} et Triboulet (1907) by an unknown actor, possibly Méliès. He has been since played by Claude Garry (1910), William Powell (1922), Aimé Simon-Girard (1937), Sacha Guitry (1937), Gérard Oury (1953), Jean Marais (1955), Pedro Armendáriz (1956), Claude Titre (1962), Bernard Pierre Donnadieu (1990), Timothy West (1998), Emmanuel Leconte (2007–2010), Alfonso Bassave (2015–2016) and Colm Meaney (2022).

French composer Jeanne Rivet used Francis' text for her song "Ou estes-vous allez?".

== See also ==
- Castell del Patriarca

Francis I of France House of Valois, Orléans-Angoulême branch Cadet branch of the Capetian dynasty Born: 12 September 1494 Died: 31 March 1547
Regnal titles
Preceded by Louis XII	King of France; 1 January 1515 – 31 March 1547	Succeeded by Henry II
Preceded by Claude as sole duchess	Duke of Brittany; 18 May 1514 – 1 January 1515 with Claude	Succeeded by Claude as sole duchess
Preceded by Maximilian Sforza	Duke of Milan; 1515–1521	Succeeded by Francis II Sforza
Preceded by Francis II Sforza	Duke of Milan; 1524–1525	Succeeded by Francis II Sforza
French nobility
Vacant Merged in the crown Title last held by Louis	Duke of Valois; 1498 – 1 January 1515	Vacant Merged in the crown Title next held by Margaret
Preceded by Charles	Count of Angoulême; 1 January 1496 – 1 January 1515	Vacant Merged in the crown Title next held by Louise
