= Jean Clouet =

Flemish-French painter (1485–1540/1)

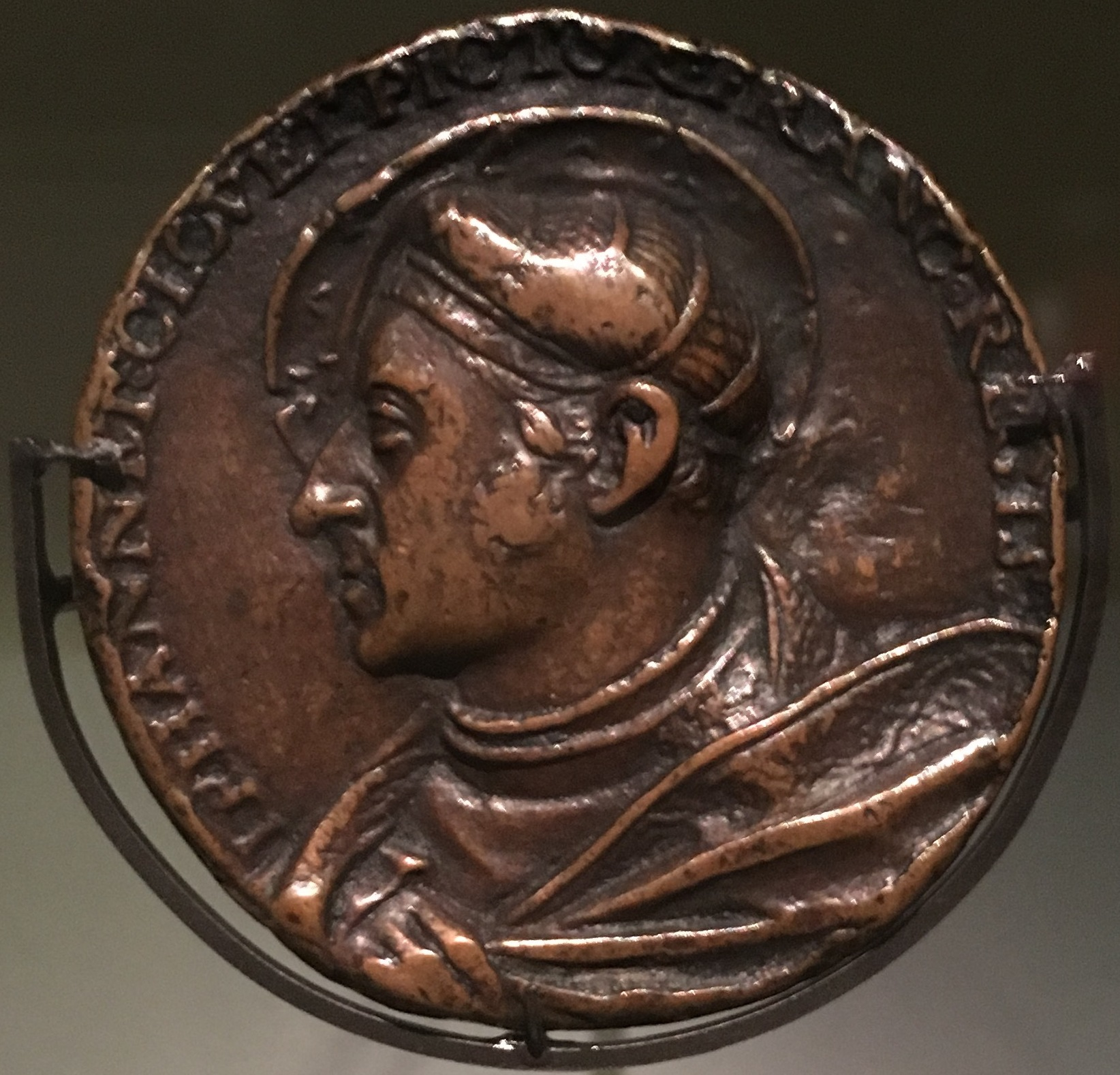
- Portrait of Jean Clouet
- Born: c. 1485; Burgundian Netherlands
- Died: 1540/1541 likely Paris, France
- Known for: Portraitist; draughtsman; miniaturist
- Movement: French Renaissance
- Patrons: Francis I of France

Jean (or Janet or Jehannot) Clouet (French pronunciation: [ʒɑ̃ klu.ɛ]; c. 1485 – 1540/1541) was a painter, draughtsman and miniaturist from the Burgundian Netherlands whose known active work period took place in France. He was court painter to French king Francis I. Together with his son François Clouet he is counted among the leading 16th century portrait painters working in France. They are particularly known for their accomplished drawings, using black chalk and pure red chalk.

== Biography ==
Little is known about the early life of Clouet. Art historians have generally assumed that he was a native of the Burgundian Netherlands, either in French speaking Valenciennes, County of Hainaut or Flemish speaking Brussels, Duchy of Brabant. He may have been the Jehan Cloet from Brussels mentioned in the accounts of the Duke of Burgundy. His father may have been Michel Clauwet or Clauet, a painter from Valenciennes who had settled in Brussels. In a document regarding the succession of his uncle, the painter Simon Marmion, dated 6 May 1499, Michel's two minor children, Janet and Polet, are mentioned, but there is no evidence that this Janet Clauwet was indeed Jean Clouet. Born around 1485 and trained in Flanders, Clouet spent most of his career in France.

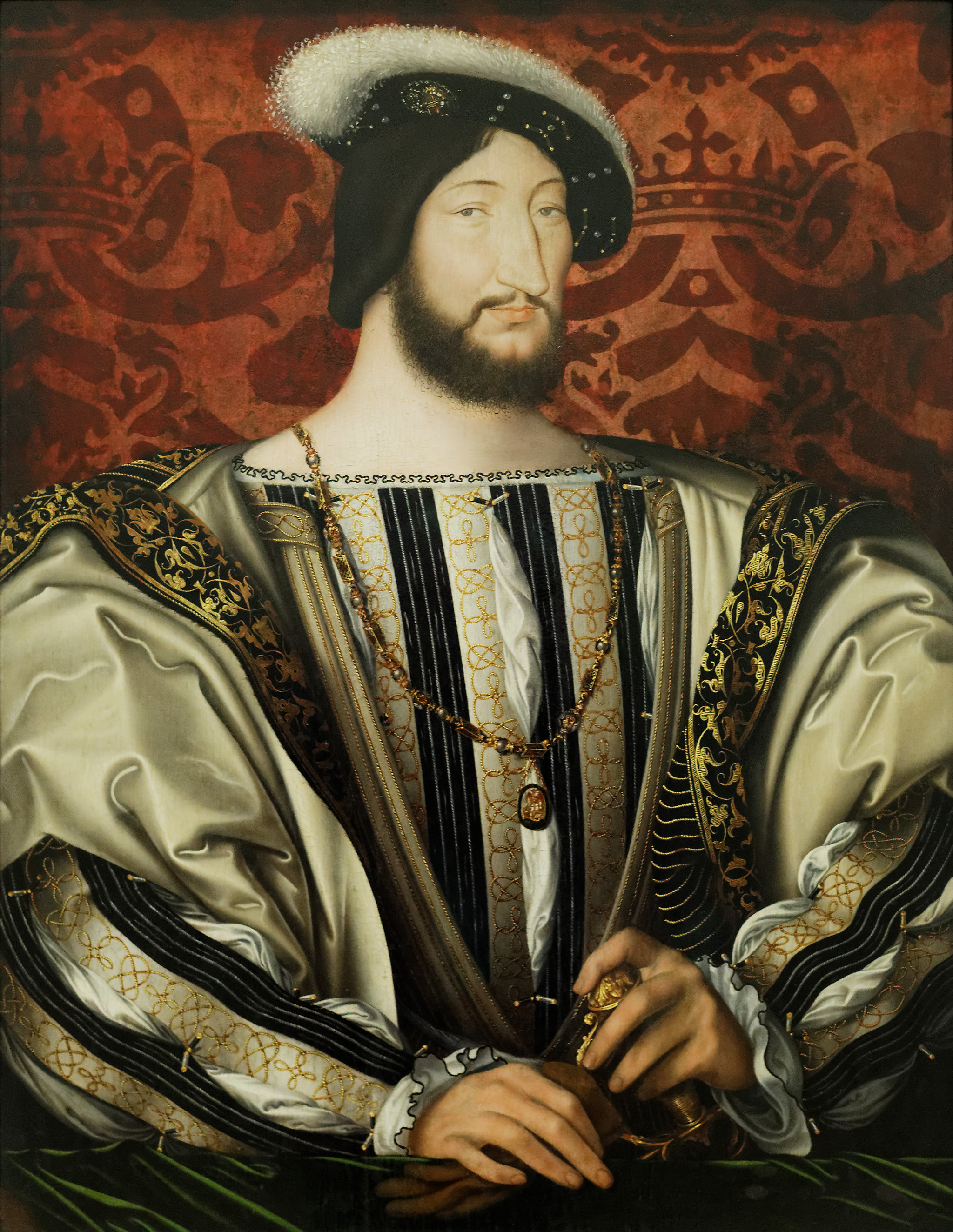
Jean Clouet with possibly assistance of François Clouet, Francis I of France, c. 1530, oil on panel, Louvre.

His connection with the Paris court of the French King Francis I is attested in the court accounts from 1516 until 1537. Originally he was appointed as painter and wardrobe valet at wages of 180 livres tournois. He was promoted to extraordinary valet in 1519 and finally to the new position of painter and gentleman in 1524. In 1522, on the death of the court painter Jean Bourdichon his wages were increased to 240 livres, equal to those received by the official portrait painter Jean Perréal. Perréal's departure in 1527 made Clouet the highest paid ordinary painter, confirming his status as the almost exclusive creator of portraits for the royal family and the court. His title of master painter, likely received in Flanders, also allowed him to work for private patrons, such as the notary of the King Jacques Thiboust, whose portrait he painted in 1516, and his uncle by marriage Pierre Fichepain, who commissioned a Saint Jerome from him in 1522.

He lived in the 1520s in Tours, where he met and married his wife Jeanne Boucault, who was the daughter of a goldsmith. The couple had two children, François who would succeed him as a court painter, and Catherine. Catherine married Abel Foullon. Their son Benjamin Foullon (or Foulon) also became a portrait painter and miniaturist. The painter Simon Bélot worked in Jean's workshop in Tours. At the end of the 1520s, the family moved to Paris, where they lived in the rue Sainte-Avoye. From 1540, Clouet, perhaps ill, was replaced in the king's service by his son François. In July 1540, he was godfather to a child of Mathurin Régnier. He died shortly afterwards, in late 1540 or early 1541, and was buried in the Holy Innocents' Cemetery. An act in the Trésor des Chartes, the ancient archives of the French crown, states that Clouet's son Jean would succeed his father as painter and valet from November 1541 and that Jean Clouet was born outside France and never became a naturalized Frenchman. The act also allows François to inherit his father's estate, which otherwise under French law would have escheated to the French crown as Jean was a foreigner.

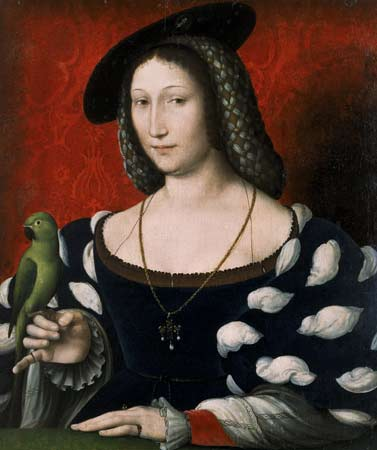
Jean Clouet, Portrait of Marguerite d'Angoulême, ca. 1530

His brother Paul, known as Clouet de Navarre, was in the service of Marguerite d'Angoulême, sister of Francis I, and is referred to in a letter written by Marguerite about 1529.

== Work ==
Jean Clouet was undoubtedly a very skillful portrait painter, although no work in existence has been proved to be his. About 10 to 15 portrait paintings are currently attributed to him and fewer miniatures, like two portrait of Francis I and two smaller ones by his workshop in the Louvre, that of an unknown man at Hampton Court, that of the Dauphin Francis, son of Francis I at Antwerp. He painted in 1530 a portrait of the mathematician Oronce Finé, at the age of 36. This portrait is now known only through a print.

Clouet is generally believed be the author of a very large number of the 130 portrait drawings now preserved at Musée Condé in Chantilly as well as other drawings at the Bibliothèque Nationale de France.

=== Paintings ===
- Portrait of Francis I as Saint John the Baptist, 1518, oil on panel, 96.5 x 79 cm, Louvre, Paris.
- Portrait of a Banker, 1522, oil on panel, 42.5 x 32.7 cm, Saint Louis Art Museum.
- Portrait of Madeleine of France, c. 1522, oil on panel, 16.1 x 12.7 cm.
- Portrait of Charlotte of France, c. 1522, oil on panel, 17.78 x 13.34 cm, Minneapolis Institute of Art.
- Portrait of the Dauphin Francis of France, 1522–1525, 16 x 13 cm, Royal Museum of Fine Arts Antwerp.
- Portrait of Madame de Canaples, c. 1525, oil on panel, 36 x 28.5 cm, National Gallery of Scotland, Edinburgh.
- Portrait of Claude de Lorraine Duke of Guise, 1528–1530, oil on panel, 29 x 26 cm, Palazzo Pitti, Florence.
- Portrait of Marguerite d'Angoulême, c. 1530, oil on panel, 59.8 x 51.4 cm, Walker Art Gallery, Liverpool.
- Portrait of Francis I, c. 1530, oil on panel, 96 x 74 cm, Louvre.
- Portrait of a Man Holding a Volume of Petrarch, formerly said Portrait of Claude d'Urfé, c. 1530–1535, oil on panel, 38.4 x 33 cm, Royal Collection, Hampton Court.
- Portrait of Guillaume Budé, c. 1536, oil on panel, 39.7 x 34.3 cm, Metropolitan Museum of Art, New York.
Paintings

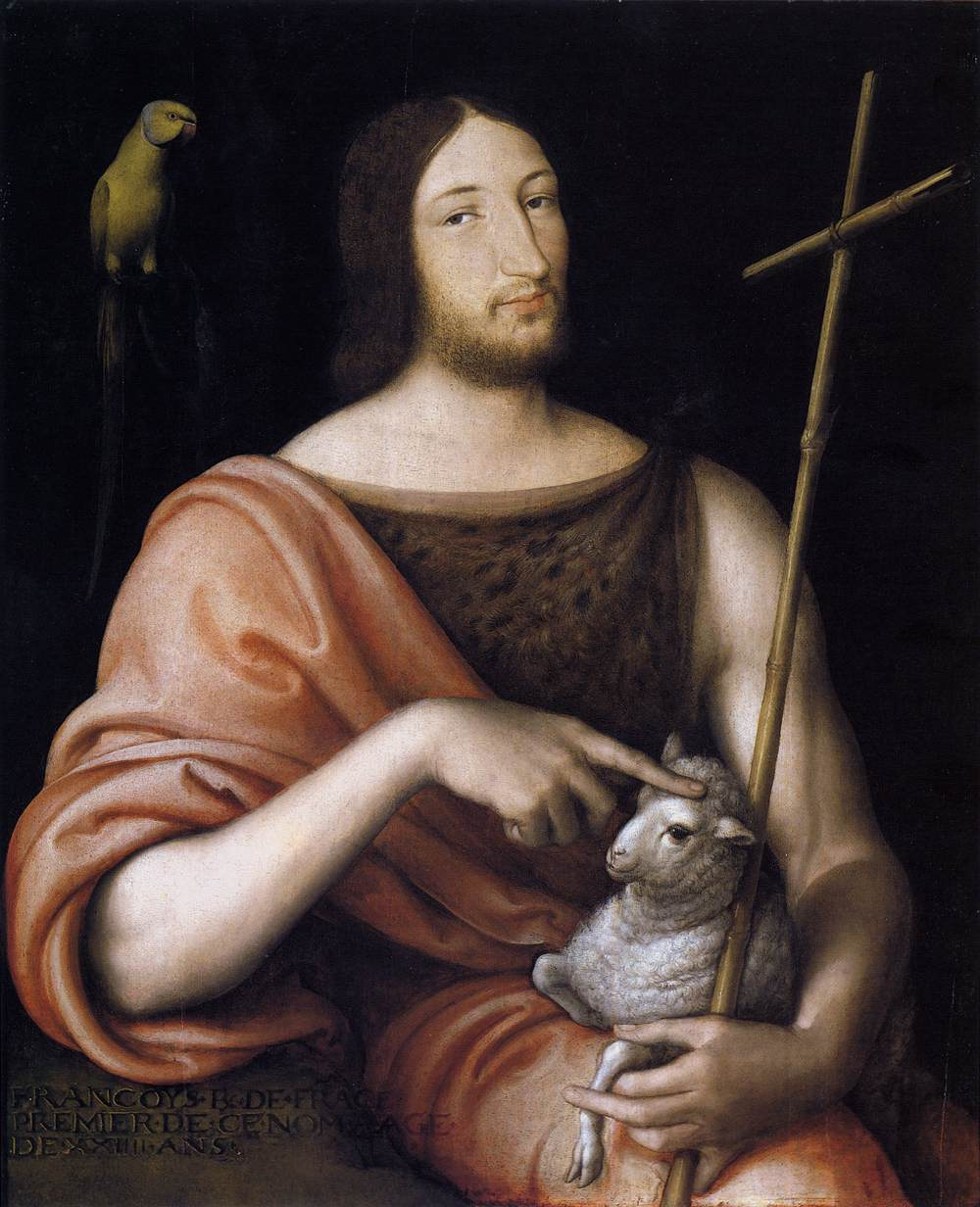
Portrait of Francis I as Saint John the Baptist, 1518, Louvre.

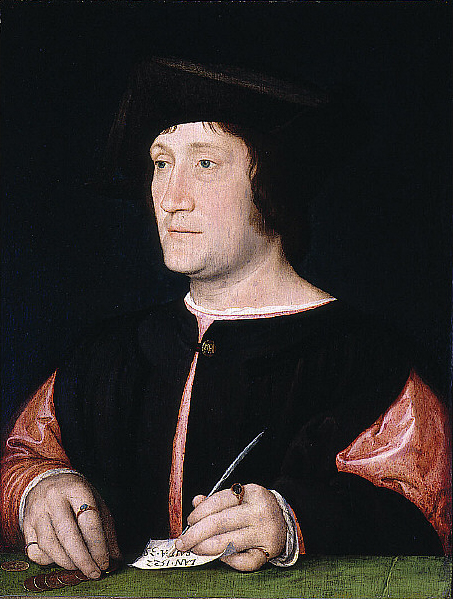
Portrait of a Banker, 1522, Saint Louis Art Museum.

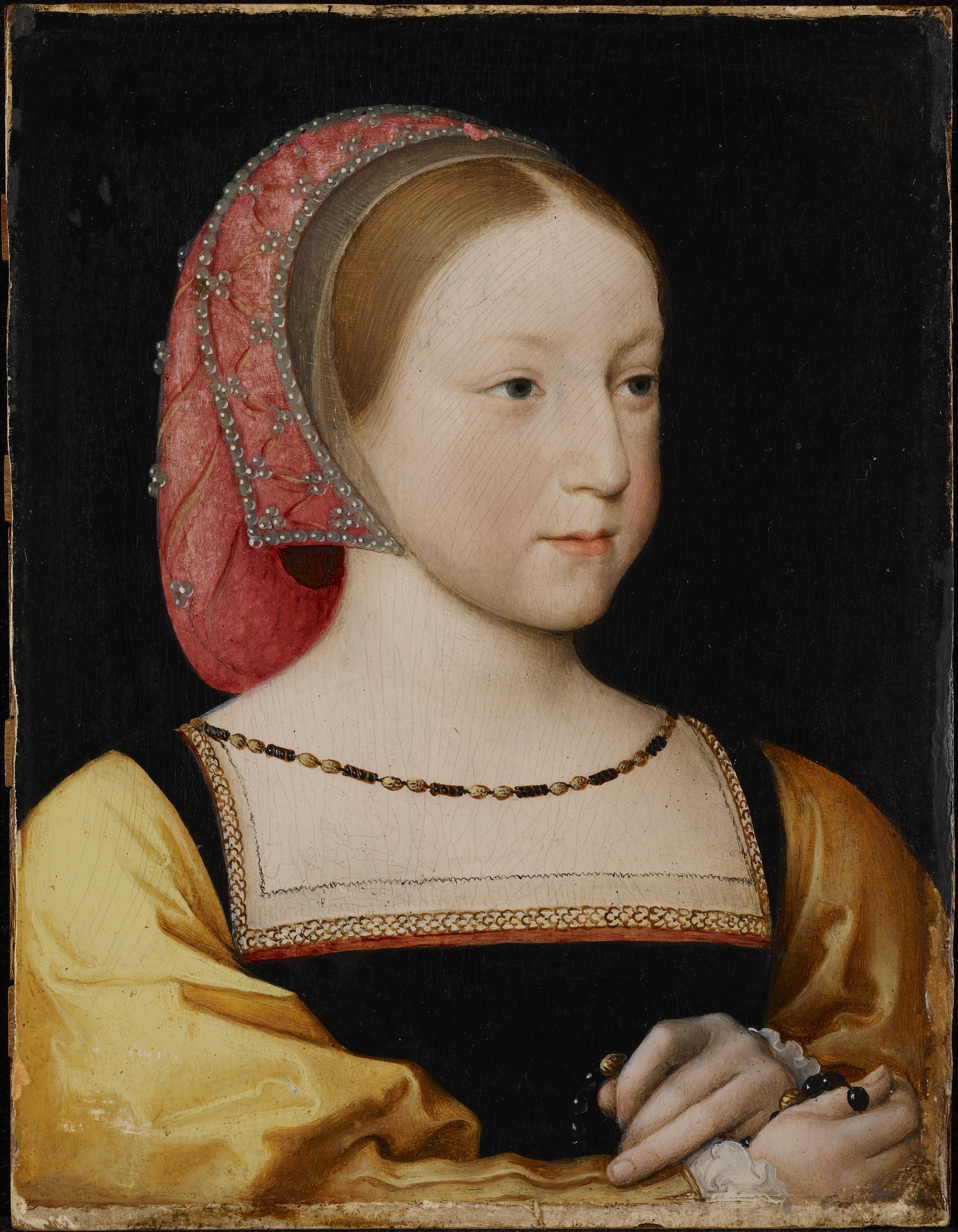
Portrait of Charlotte de France, c. 1522, Minneapolis Institute of Art.

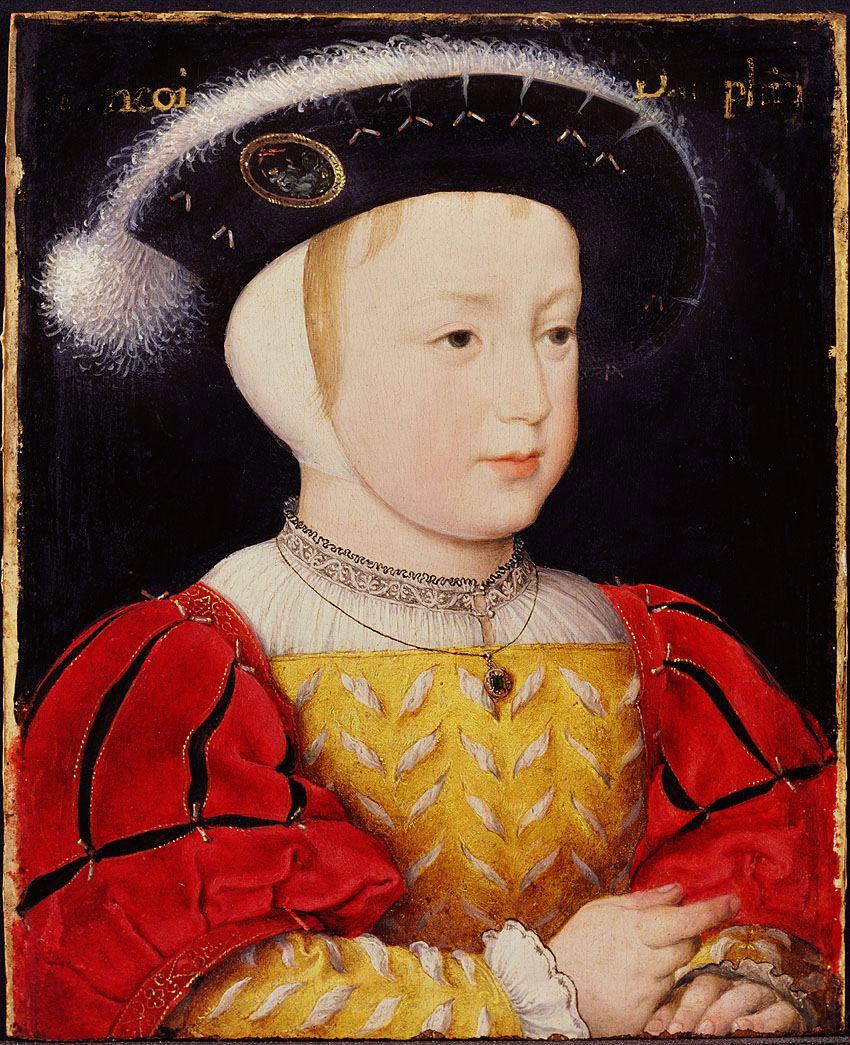
Portrait of the Dauphin Francis of France, 1522–1525, Royal Museum of Fine Arts Antwerp.
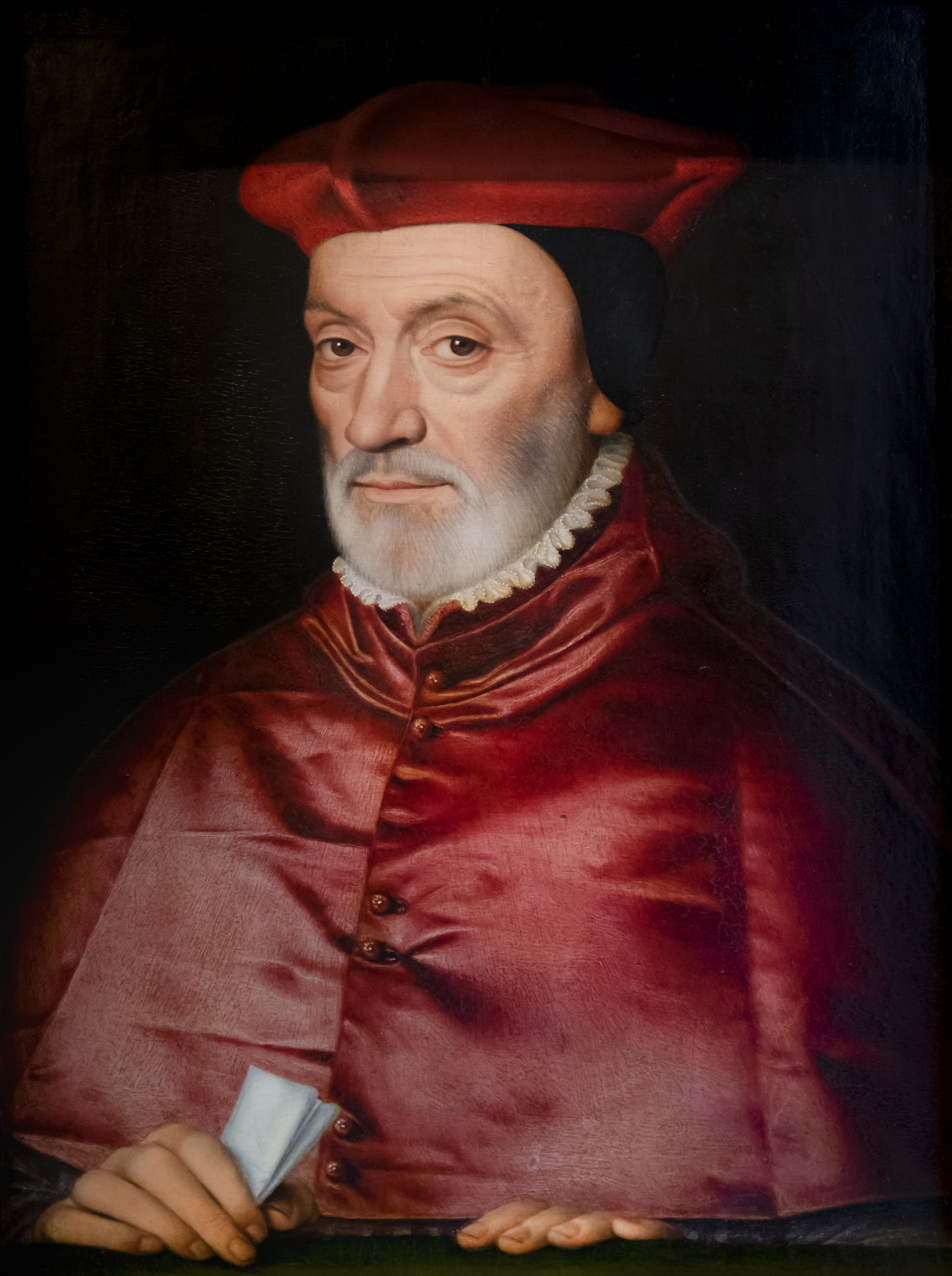
Jean Bertrand, archbishop and cardinal of Sens, 1530-1540, Fondation Bemberg, Toulouse.

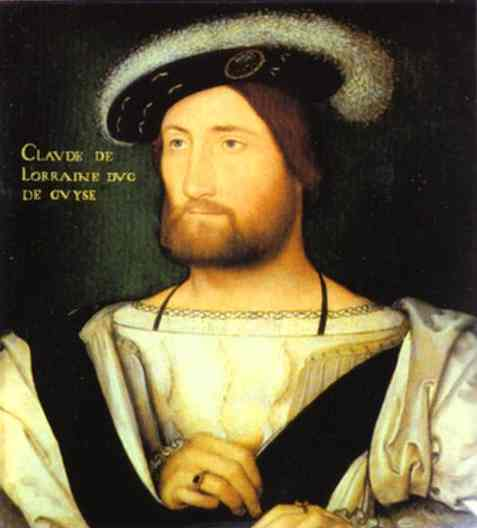
Portrait of Claude de Lorraine Duke of Guise, 1528–1530, Palazzo Pitti, Florence.

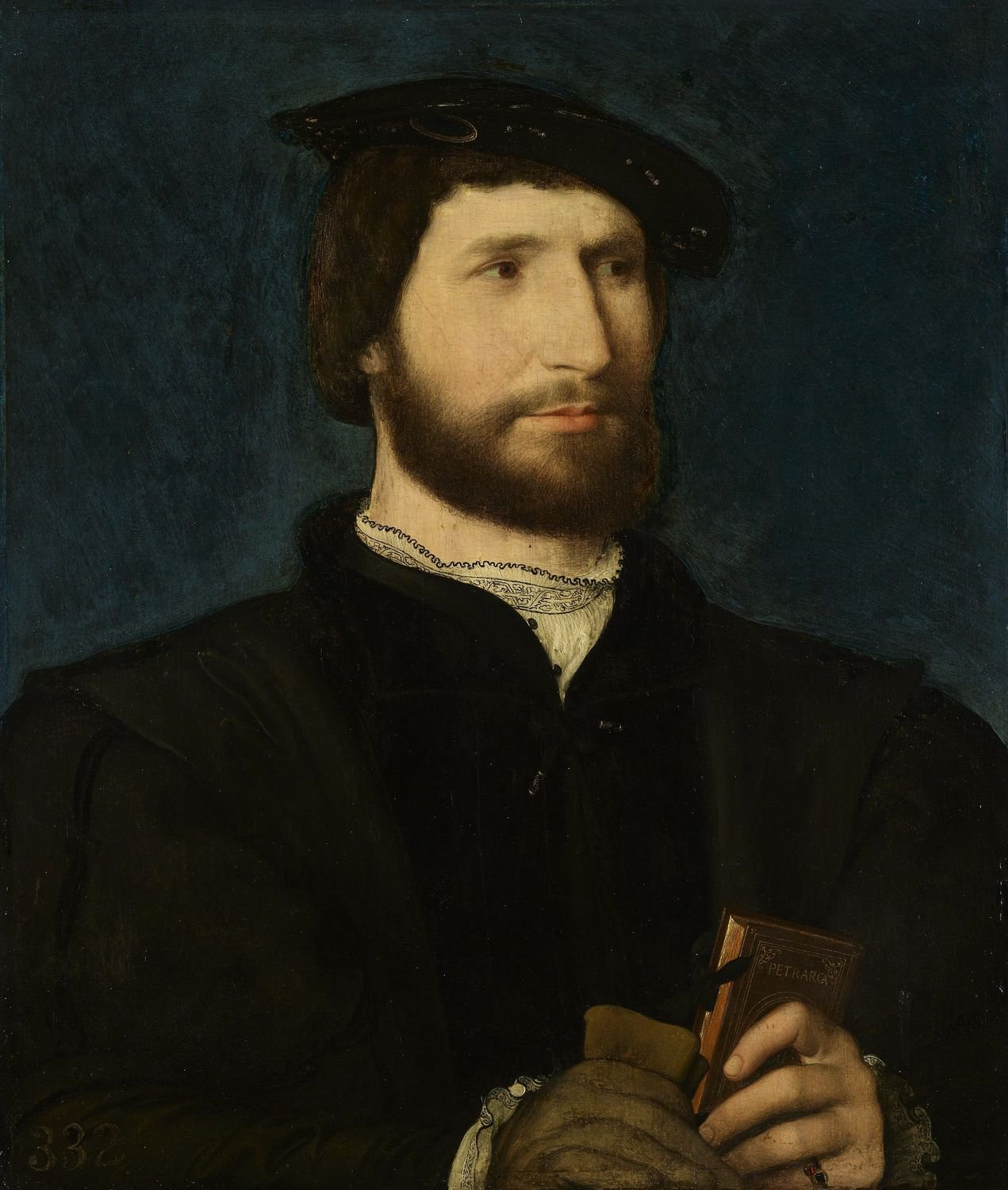
Portrait of a Man Holding a Volume of Petrarch, c. 1530–1535, Royal Collection, Hampton Court.

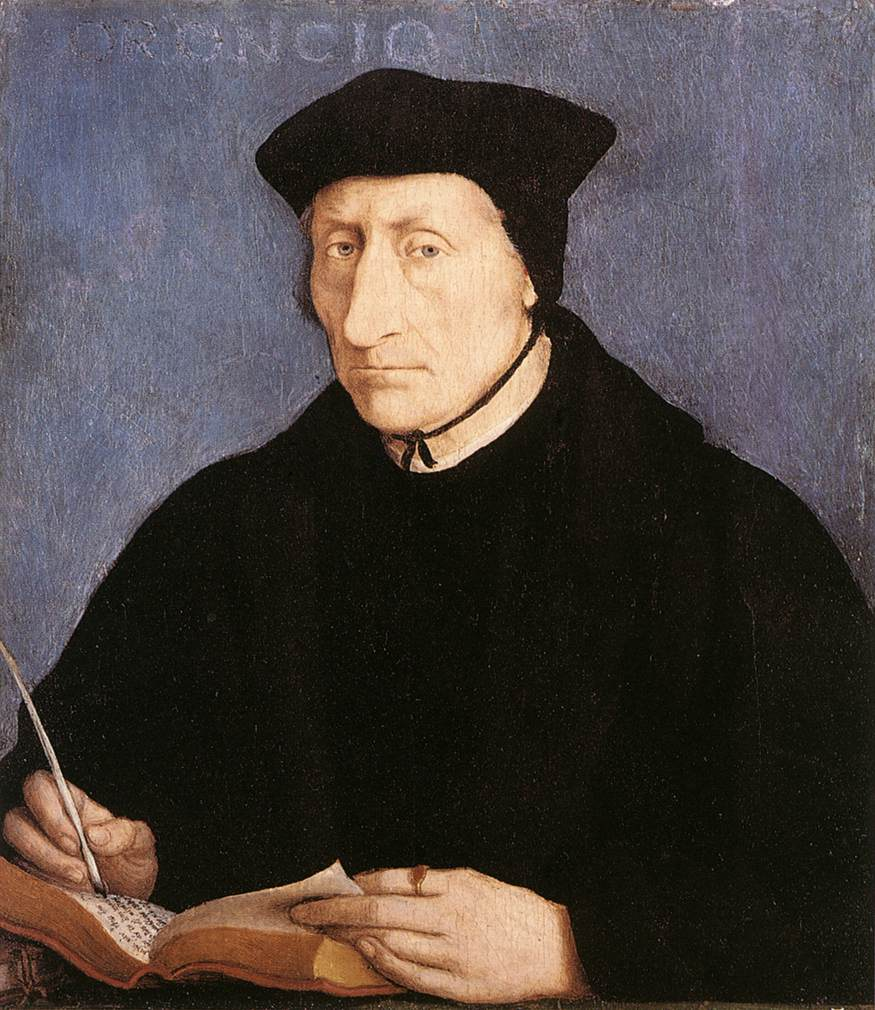
Portrait of Guillaume Budé, c. 1536, Metropolitan Museum of Art.

=== Drawings and miniatures ===
Seven miniature portraits in the Manuscript of the Gallic War in the Bibliothèque Nationale (13,429) are attributed to Jean Clouet with very strong probability, and to these may be added an eighth in the collection of J. P. Morgan, and representing Charles I de Cossé, Maréchal de Brissac, identical in its characteristics with the seven already known. There are other miniatures in the collection of Mr Morgan, which may be attributed to Jean Clouet with some strong degree of probability, inasmuch as they closely resemble the portrait drawings at Chantilly and in Paris which are taken to be his work.

The collection of drawings preserved in France, and attributed to this artist and his school, comprises portraits of all the important persons of the time of Francis I. In one album of drawings the portraits are annotated by the king himself, and his merry reflections, stinging taunts or biting satires, add very largely to a proper understanding of the life of his time and court. Definite evidence, however, is still lacking to establish the attribution of the best of these drawings and of certain oil paintings to Jean Clouet.

Drawings

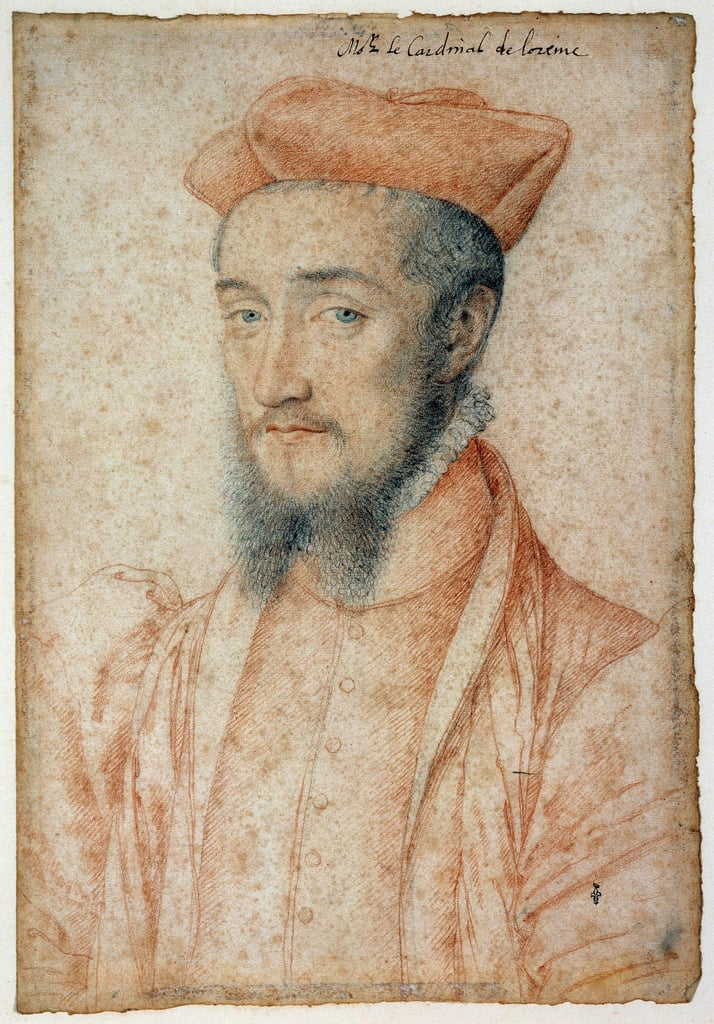
Cardinal Charles de Lorraine.

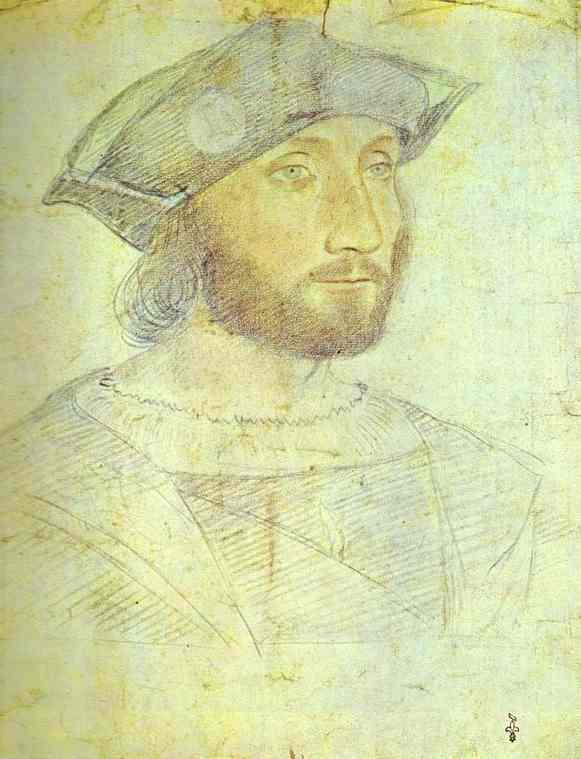
Guillaume Gouffier de Bonnivet.

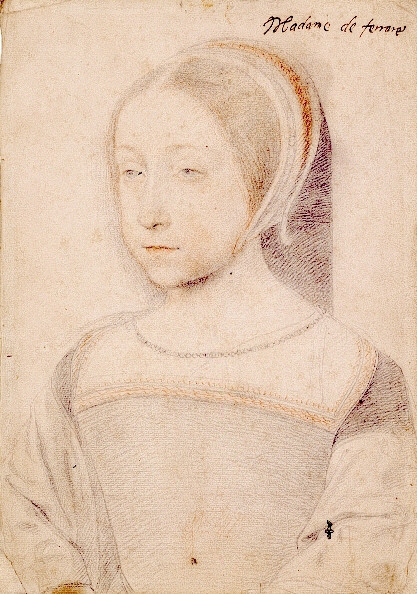
Renée of France.

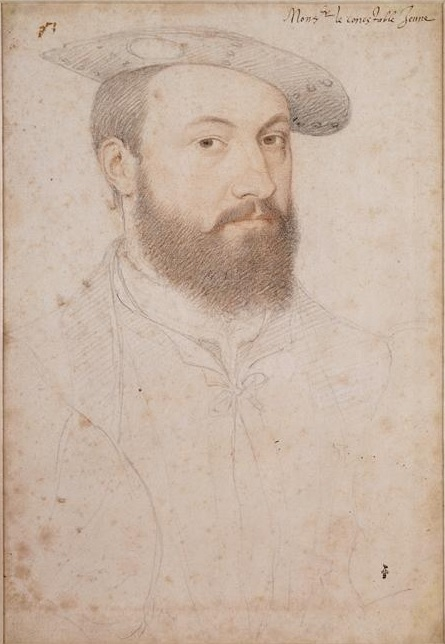
Anne de Montmorency.
Miniature tentatively attributed to Jean Clouet

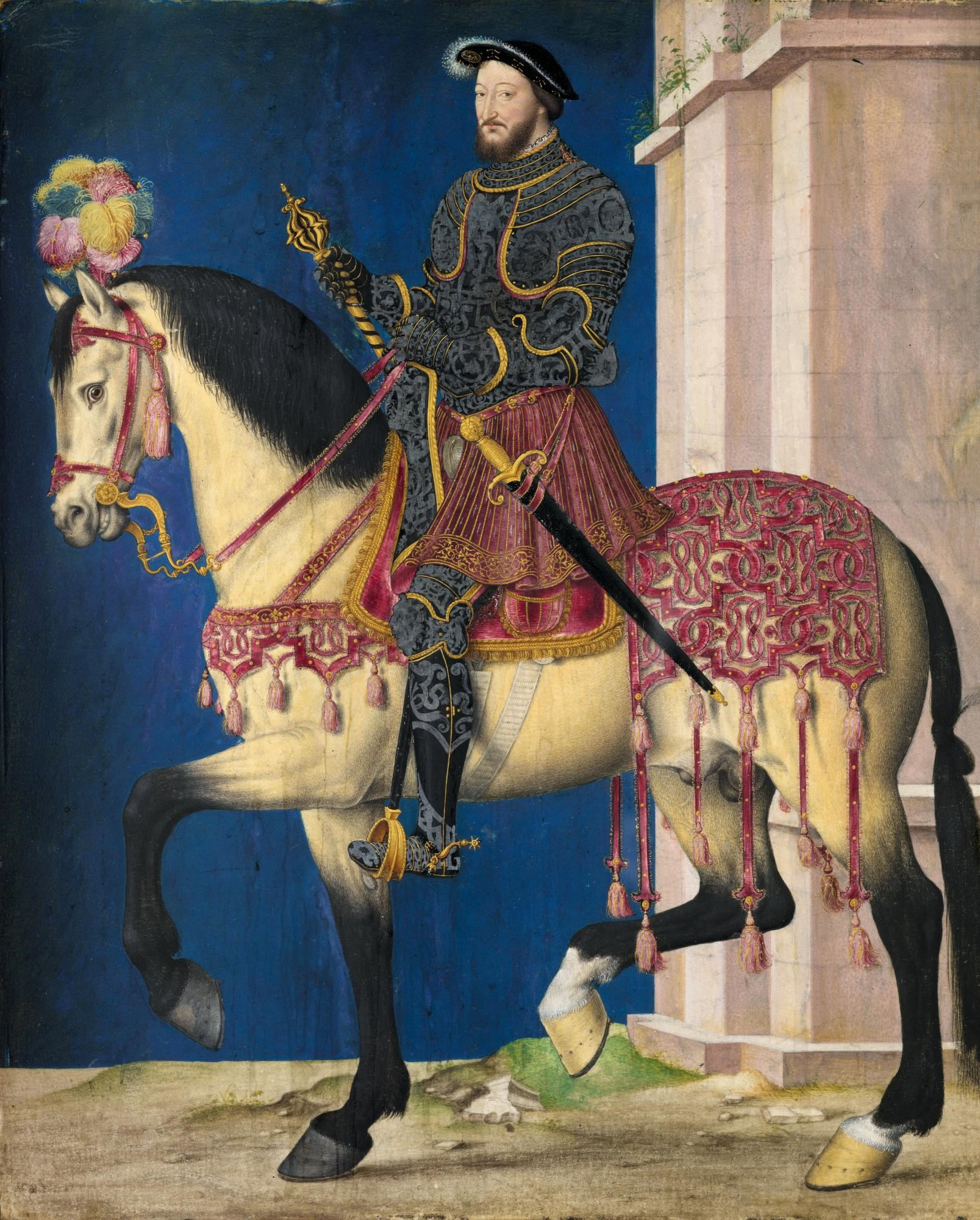
Equestrian portrait of Francis I, c. 1540, miniature on vellum, 27 x 22 cm, Louvre.
