= Albert von Stein =

Albert von Stein (fl. 1513–22) was a Swiss mercenary captain. During the War of the League of Cambrai, having arrived late to the Battle of Novara, he abandoned the Swiss army before the Battle of Marignano. In 1522, he was the chief of the Swiss captains in the service of Odet de Foix, Vicomte de Lautrec, and was killed commanding one of the Swiss columns at the Battle of Bicocca during the Italian War of 1521-26.
