= Gian Giacomo Medici =

Italian soldier (1498–1555)

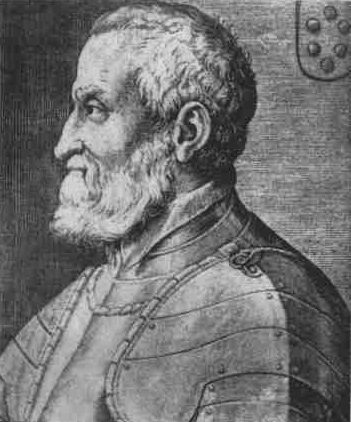
- Born: 25 January 1498; Milan
- Died: 8 November 1555 (aged 57); Milan
- Military career
- Allegiance: Duchy of Milan; Holy Roman Empire; Spanish Empire
- Service years: 1521-1526, 1532-1555
- Rank: General
- Nickname: Il Medeghino
- Conflicts: Italian War of 1521-1526; Battle of Vaprio d'Adda; Ottoman–Habsburg wars; Siege of Pest; Italian War of 1542-1546; Siege of Saint-Dizier; Schmalkaldic War; Battle of Mühlberg; Italian War of 1551-1559; Siege of Metz; Battle of Marciano

Gian Giacomo Medici or Jacopo de' Medici (25 January 1498 – 8 November 1555) was an Italian condottiero, Marchese of Marignano and Marquess of Musso and Lecco in Lombardy.

He served Francesco II Sforza during their alliance to the King of Spain and Holy Roman Emperor Charles V. After a brief period of rebellion, he joined the armies of Charles V, becoming one of his main Italian generals. He gained renown for his leadership and guerrilla expertise, as well as for his cruelty.

== Biography ==
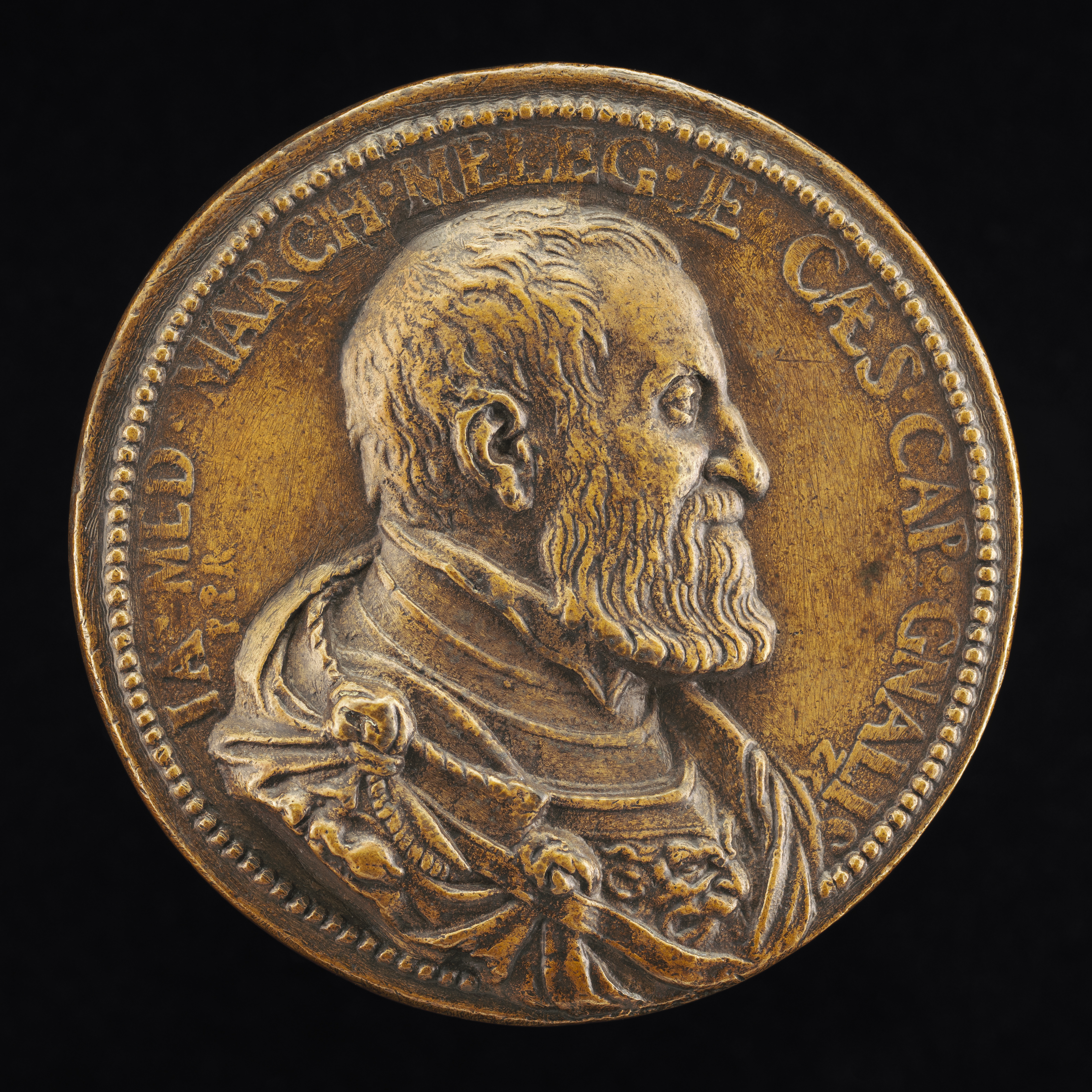
Medici's portrait on the obverse of a medallion by Pier Paolo Galeotti (c. 1552)

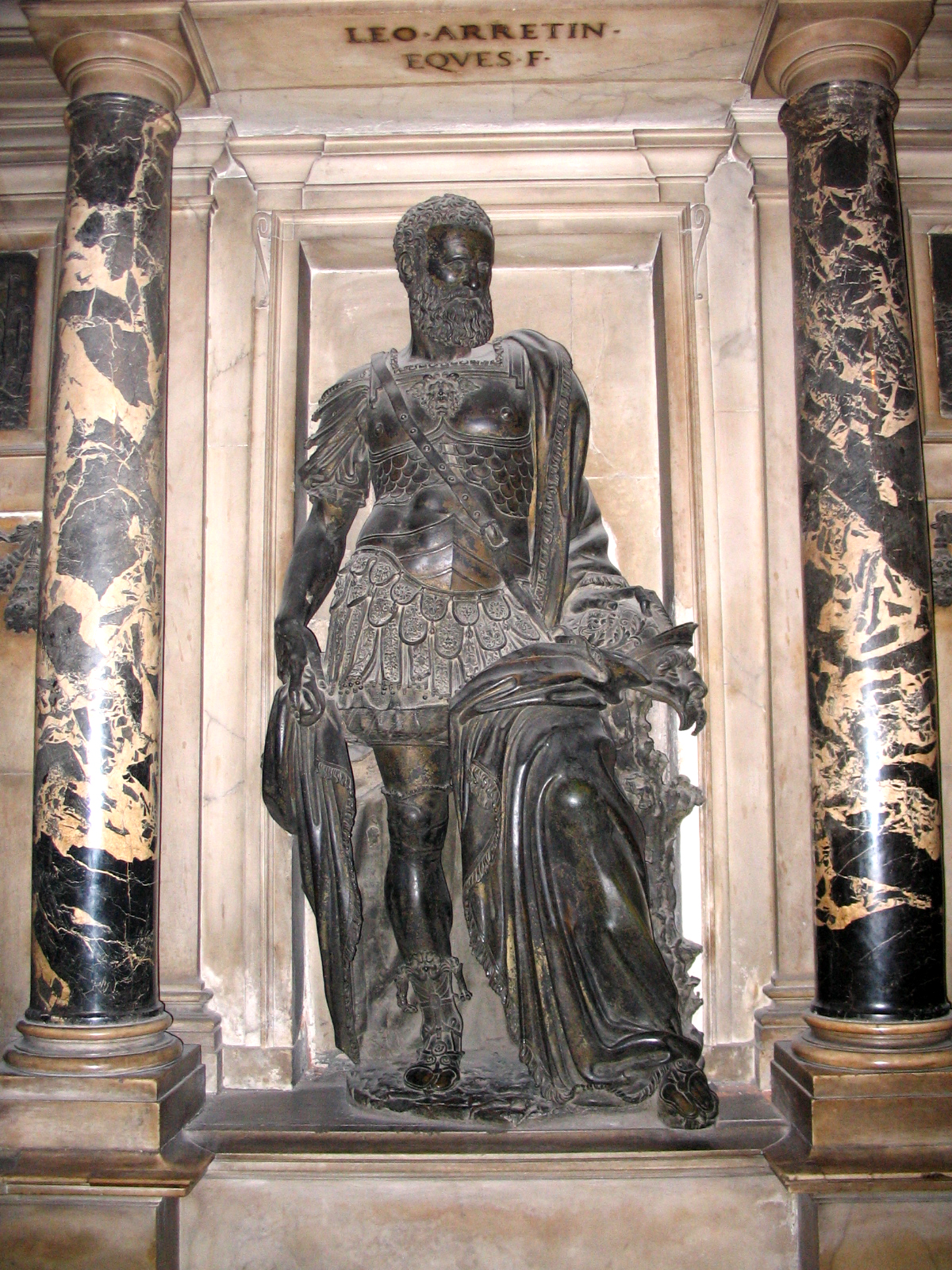
Statue of Medici from his funerary monument by Leone Leoni in the cathedral of Milan (1560–1563)

Gian Giacomo Medici was the brother of Giovanni Angelo Medici, who was later to be elected Pope as Pius IV. They were scions of an impoverished, though patrician, family of Milan not connected with the Medici of Florence, in spite of the Medici heraldic palle appearing in the contemporary engraving (illustration): thus the nickname Il Medeghino, the "little Medici". Gian Giacomo, the eldest of fourteen children, was banished from Milan after a daring murder of revenge in broad daylight. He fled to Lake Como, where he gathered about him a band of brigands answerable to none but him.

That he fled to Lake Como was no coincidence. Evidence can be found that Marquis Giacomo di Medici was born in Valsolda and even had a residence in the community of Porlezza. In the main church of Cima, which belongs to the community of Porlezza, an inconspicuous relief shows the lion of San Marco, a symbol of the alliance between Gian Giacomo de Medici and the former Republic of Venice. It was put there in honour of his achievements. A description of the relief can be found on a plaque alongside. It is likely that Gian Giacomo even had a residence in Cima, on the same spot where now stands a hotel, probably not called by chance Parco San Marco.

=== Italian Wars of 1521-1546 ===
He threw in his lot as bodyguard to the future Duke of Milan, Francesco II Sforza, whom he helped reinstate in Milan by Emperor Charles V after a role in the Battle of Vaprio d'Adda. The Medeghino gained a reputation for unscrupulous violence in the Sforza pay; in partial recompense, he was made Marquis of Musso and Lecco. However, after political disagreements and a brief war against Imperial general Antonio de Leyva, who defeated him in Carate, Medeghino negotiated his entrance to Charles' service. After a brief private war against the Sforza in 1530-1532, which went badly for him, he handed back Musso and Lecco in exchange for the Marquisate of Marignano in February 1532.

Remaining in the pay of Charles V until the end of his career, Il Medeghino became a famous condottiere, or soldier of fortune. The great engineer Agostino Ramelli trained with Gian Giacomo, who instructed him in mathematics and architecture.

In 1543, he had purchased the ancient fortified castle of Frascarolo, near present-day Induno Olona, in the Valceresio, which he converted into a sumptuous villa. In the summer of 1545, he married Marzia Orsini, daughter of Ludovico Orsini, conte di Pitigliano.

=== Schmalkaldic War ===
During the Schmalkaldic War in 1546, upon the advance of Protestant general Sebastian Schertlin towards Ulm, Medici withdrew to Regensburg, where he joined Emperor Charles V's main army. Leaving Pirro Colonna in charge of the city, they came out against the Protestants, now reinforced by John Frederick of Saxony and Philip I of Hesse with over 60,000 men and 110 artillery pieces, compared to the 13.000 men of the Imperial army. The two camps bombarded each other for four days, but the defenses built by Medici's design in the Imperial camp rendered the enemy superiority at artillery largely ineffective, after which the Protestant force retreated on September 1546. After being reinforced themselves, Medici then advised Charles V in his cross of the Danube. Medici later participated in the Battle of Mühlberg, which put an end to the war.

=== Italian War of 1551-1559 ===
In 1552, Charles V and Cosimo I de' Medici appointed him grand general of the army in charge of subduing the Republic of Siena, recently allied with Henry II of France against them. Chiappino Vitelli acted as his lieutenant. Medici and Vitelli besieged Siena, which Piero Strozzi from the Franco-Sienese battle attempted to break with sorties. Although Medici preferred to avoid a direct battle, Cosimo ordered him to confront the aggressive Strozzi. During the subsequent Battle of Marciano of 1554, Medici crushed the Franco-Sienese army with barely any casualties on his side, months after which Siena capitulated. He was made a knight of the Order of the Golden Fleece the following year, also the year of his death.

Il Medeghino is buried in the Duomo of Milan. Since his only son, Camillo (1565-1586), was illegitimate, albeit made a Knight of the Order of Malta, Gian Giacomo's honours passed to his brother Agosto (1501–1570).
