= Françoise de Foix =

Mistress of King Francis I of France

- Comtesse de Châteaubriant
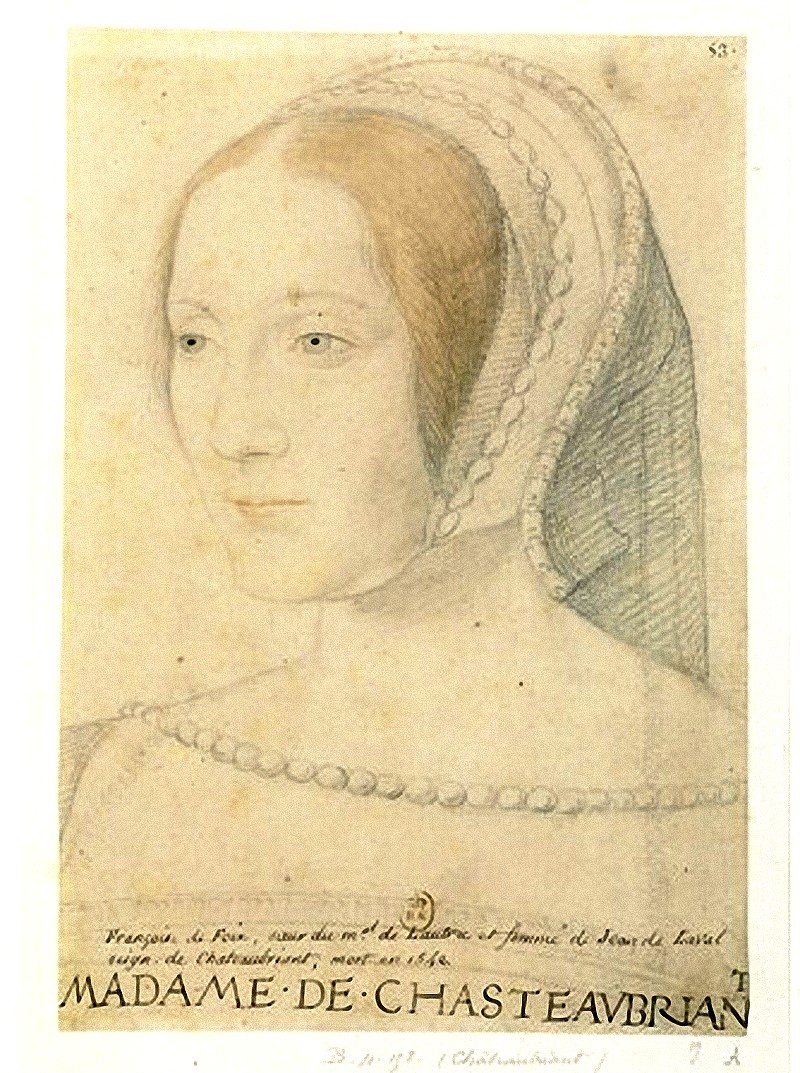
- Known for: Maîtresse-en-titre of Francis I of France
- Born: c. 1495
- Died: 16 October 1537
- Noble family: Foix
- Spouses: Jean de Laval, Count of Châteaubriant
- Issue: Anne
- Father: Jean de Foix, Vicomte de Lautrec
- Mother: Jeanne d'Aydie
- Occupation: Lady-in-waiting of Claude of France

Françoise de Foix, Comtesse de Châteaubriant (French pronunciation: [fʁɑ̃swaz də fwa]; c. 1495 – 16 October 1537) was a chief mistress of Francis I of France.

== Background ==
Born into the House of Foix, Françoise was the daughter of Jean de Foix, Vicomte de Lautrec, and Jeanne d'Aydie. Her father was the son of Pierre de Foix, Vicomte de Lautrec; Pierre had been a younger brother of Gaston IV of Foix, who had married Leonor, Queen of Navarre. Françoise was thus a second cousin of the Duchess of Brittany and Queen of France, Anne, whose mother had been a daughter of Gaston IV and Leonor. Françoise was brought up at Anne's court, where she met Jean de Laval, count of Châteaubriant, to whom she was engaged in 1505. On 11 March 1508 she gave birth to a daughter, Anne, who died on 12 April 1521. The couple formally married in 1509, living together at Châteaubriant until Francis I called them at court in 1516. Tall and dark-haired, she was also cultured, spoke Latin and Italian, and wrote poetry.

== Official mistress ==
Upon arriving at the royal court, Françoise's attributes and gifts made her alluring to the equally gifted and cultured King, who promptly attempted to seduce her. He began to give favours and gifts to her family. Her husband became a commander of a company. Her elder brother, the Viscount of Lautrec, received the charge of governor of the Milanese duchy. Her two other brothers, Thomas, lord of Lescun, and André, lord of Lesparre or Asparros, were also promoted to high positions in the military by the king. Françoise eventually became the mistress of the king, after a period of resistance, circa 1518.

On 25 April 1519 the Dauphin François was baptised at Amboise. Jean de Châteaubriant and his wife assisted in the ceremony, and Françoise was placed near to the royal princesses, which signified to the Court that she was La mye du roi ("The Sweetheart of the King"). She was the first official mistress that Francis had taken, and he made his affections for her plain to the Court, against her wishes. This greatly displeased his mother, Louise of Savoy, who disliked the de Foix family.

By contrast, Françoise's husband, Jean, though inevitably aware of the affair, showed little interest in the matter: when, in December 1519, Francis sent him to Brittany to negotiate a tax, the Count thanked Francis, and did not raise the matter of the affair. During this time, Françoise remained at the Court, where she was made a lady-in-waiting of Queen Claude, the Duchess of Brittany. In 1524, before his wife died, Francis I had sexual intercourse with Françoise.

Françoise remained the official mistress of Francis for a decade. She had no political influence, only managing to persuade the King to not disgrace her brother after his defeat at the Battle of Bicocca. However, in 1525, the King was captured at the Battle of Pavia and held captive in Madrid. When he returned to France, the young and blonde Anne de Pisseleu d'Heilly caught his attention. The two women battled for the King's affections for two years before Françoise gave up and returned to Châteaubriant in 1528.

== Later life and death ==
After returning to Châteaubriant, Françoise continued to live with her husband, Jean, who was made governor of Brittany and received other favours. Françoise still continued to write letters to the King, who visited Châteaubriant many times. His last visit seems to be in 1532, when he stayed at the new castle that Jean had constructed in May.

Françoise de Foix died on 16 October 1537. Her death is the subject of rumours: one legend, related by the French historian Antoine Varillas, and taking credence from the known brutality of Jean de Laval, claims that the Count shut his wife in a dark, padded cell and had her killed. In fact, it is considered more likely that Françoise died of a sickness.

She is interred in the church of the Trinitarians of Châteaubriant, where her husband erected a tomb in her memory, with an epitaph by Clément Marot and a statue of her. Jean de Laval died on 11 February 1543 aged 56, bequeathing a third of his possessions to Anne de Montmorency, including Châteaubriant. He was succeeded in his charges of governor of Brittany by Jean IV de Brosse, the husband of Anne de Pisseleu.

Brantôme also recounted many anecdotes about the countess. An anecdote about an unnamed mistress of Francis I, where the lady is almost surprised by the king when in bed with the admiral Bonnivet, is often attributed to Françoise de Foix.

== See also ==
- French royal mistresses

== Bibliography ==
- Georges Bordonove, Les rois qui ont fait la France. Les Valois, de François Ier à Henri III, 1515-1589, (2003). ISBN 2-85704-836-X
- Brantôme, Oeuvres complètes, Tome XII, (1894). Kraus Reprint, 1977.
- Abbé J.-J. de Expilly, Dictionnaire géographique, historique et politique des Gaules et de la France (1763). Kraus Reprint, 1978.
- Abbé Goudé, Châteaubriant, baronnie, ville et paroisse, (1869).
- Louis-Gabriel Michaud, Biographie universelle ancienne et moderne, (1854).
