= Thomas de Foix-Lescun =

French commander

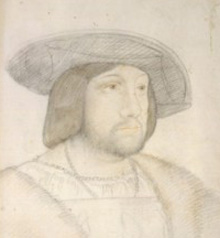
Marshal Thomas de Foix-Lescun. Drawing from the 16th century by Jean Clouet.

Thomas de Foix-Lescun (died 3 March 1525), commonly known as Lescun, was a French commander during the Italian War of 1521, Marshal of France (1518) and the brother of Odet de Foix, Vicomte de Lautrec, André de Foix, Lord of Lesparre and Françoise de Foix.

== Biography ==
After a ecclesiastical career in his youth, he accompanied King Francis I of France in the conquest of the Duchy of Milan. He helped Pope Leo X in the conquest of the Duchy of Urbino and in 1518 he was made Marshal of France. As the French governor of Milan, his severe rule gained him the people's enmity, and he had to retreat to Parma until the arrival of his brother.

At the Battle of Vaprio d'Adda, he commanded the French reinforcements before retreating from the Imperial army under Prospero Colonna. In April 1522, during the Battle of Bicocca, he commanded the cavalry force which attempted to flank Colonna and was wounded. After this defeat, he assumed command of the remnants of the French army and retreated to Cremona, where he was forced to surrender. Later he was responsible for the French withdrawal from Italy.

He fought in the battle of Pavia, being wounded while he was rescuing King Francis I. He was made prisoner and subsequently died out of his wounds.
