= Treaty of Worms =

Treaty of Worms may refer to:

- Treaty of Worms (1523), between the Holy Roman Empire and Venice during the Italian Wars
- Treaty of Worms (1743), between Britain, Austria and Sardinia during the War of the Austrian Succession

== See also ==
- Concordat of Worms
