= Treaty of Bruges =

Treaty of Bruges may refer to:

- Treaty of Bruges (1375), between France and England during the Hundred Years' War
- Treaty of Bruges (1521), between England and Spain during the Italian War of 1521–1526
