= Treaty of Worms (1523) =

The Treaty of Worms of 29 July 1523 was an agreement between Charles V, Holy Roman Emperor; Henry VIII, King of England; Ferdinand I, Archduke of Austria; Francesco II Sforza, Duke of Milan; and the Republic of Venice. Pope Adrian VI pushed for the treaty, although he was not a signatory. The main result of the treaty was Imperial recognition of Venice's Terraferma in return for Venetian support against France in the ongoing Italian War.

The treaty was a violation of Venice's 1513 treaty of Blois with France, which had been renewed in 1517 and required Venice to support France's claim to the Duchy of Milan. In 1523, Venice recognized the Sforza claim supported by the Empire and Spain. Venice agreed to match the troops provided by Charles V for the defence of Milan and to come to the aid of the Kingdom of Naples with 15 galleys in the even that Naples was attacked by a Christian power. All parties, however, were exempted from any requirement to fight the Papal State and Venice was not require to assist Naples in the even that she was at war with the Ottoman Empire.

Charles V in turn recognized Venice's possession of former imperial territories in Italy, for which was to pay 200,000 ducats over eight years. The general terms of the treaty declared a truce, the suspension of reprisals, freedom of trade and residence, and amnesty with the return of confiscated property. Venice in particular was to pay 5,000 ducats a year to Imperial subjects who had lost property. For the truce, which was to last four years, Venice paid 38,000 ducats. The king of England signed the treaty as a guarantor.

After the signing, Doge Andrea Gritti wrote to King Francis I of France justifying his decision to switch sides on the grounds that the French did not send troops to Italy in time. The new treaty did not last long. France recaptured Milan in October 1524 and Venice switched sides again.
