= Odet de Foix, Viscount of Lautrec =

French military leader

Odet de Foix
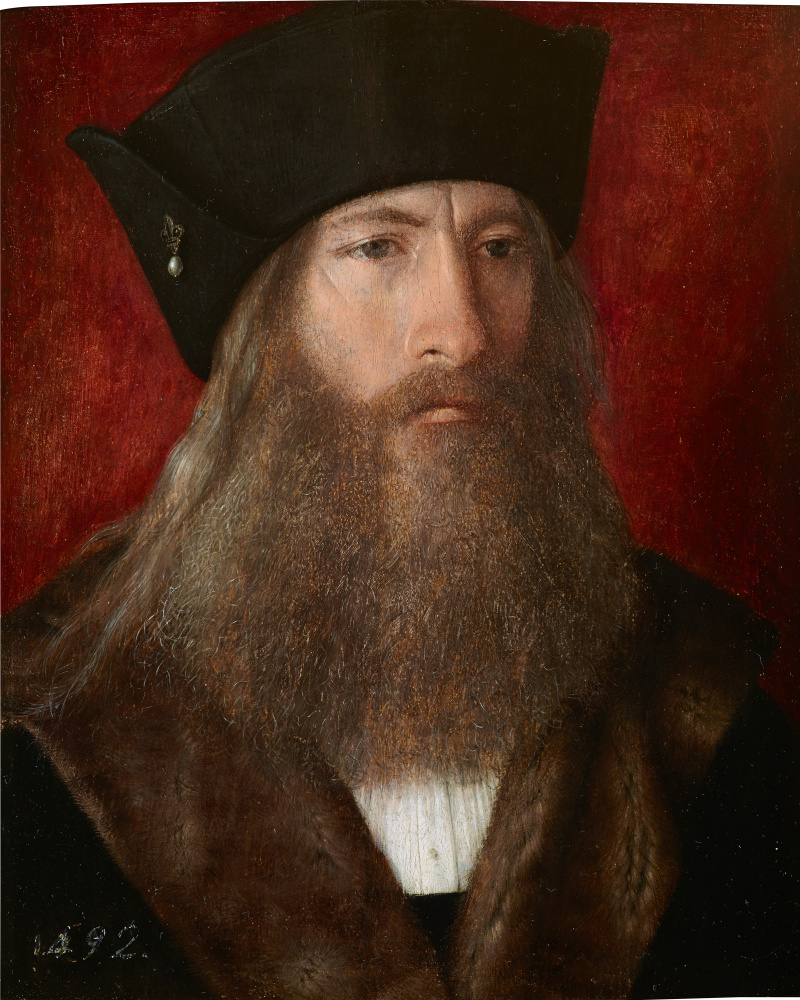
- Born: c. 1483–1485; Guyenne
- Died: 15 August 1528; Naples, Italy
- Burial place: Church of Santa Maria la Nova
- Spouse(s): Charlotte d'Albret, Countess of Rethel
- Military career
- Allegiance: France
- Service years: 1499-1528
- Rank: Marshal of France
- Nicknames: Lord of Barbazan; Viscount of Lautrec; Count of Comminges
- Conflicts: Battle of Ravenna; Battle of Marignano; Operations in Val Vestino; Battle of Vaprio; Siege of Pavia; Battle of Bicocca; Siege of Genoa; Siege of Melfi; Siege of Naples

Odet de Foix, Vicomte de Lautrec (1485 – 15 August 1528) was a French military leader, a knight of the Order of St. Michael and grand seneschal of Guyenne. As Marshal of France, he commanded the campaign to conquer Naples, but died from the typhus in 1528.

== Biography ==
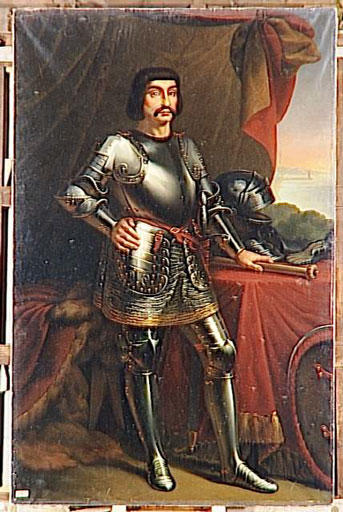
An 1834 copy of a portrait of Odet de Foix preserved at the palace of Versailles, the original was preserved at Beauregard Castle.

Odet was born between 1483 and 1485, the son of Jean de Foix and Jeanne d'Aydie. His siblings were André de Foix (Lord of Lesparre and Count of Montfort), Thomas de Foix (also Marshal of France), and Françoise de Foix (Countess of Châteaubriant, Official Mistress of king Francis I). He and his two brothers, served king Francis as captains; and the influence of their sister, who became the king's mistress, gained them high office.

== Military career ==
=== War of The League of Cambrai (1508–1516) ===
Following his entry to the military service, this was the first war in which he fought, not yet as a Marshal of France, but as a Lieutenant General. Foix was then sent to the Italian Peninsula at the outbreak of the war, serving initially under the supreme command of Charles II d'Amboise. He participated in the decisive French victory over the Republic of Venice at the Battle of Agnadello on May 14, 1509. In recognition of his capabilities and aristocratic standing he was promoted Marshal of France by King Louis XII on March 1, 1511.

In early 1512, he was appointed as the primary subordinate commander to his cousin, Gaston de Foix, Duke of Nemours, who had assumed the position of supreme command of the French Army of Italy. Operating together during a swift winter campaign against the forces of The Holy League of Spain, Venice and The Papal States. The two successfully relieved the Siege of Bologna on February 5, 1512 and initiated the Sacking of Brescia on February 18, 1512.

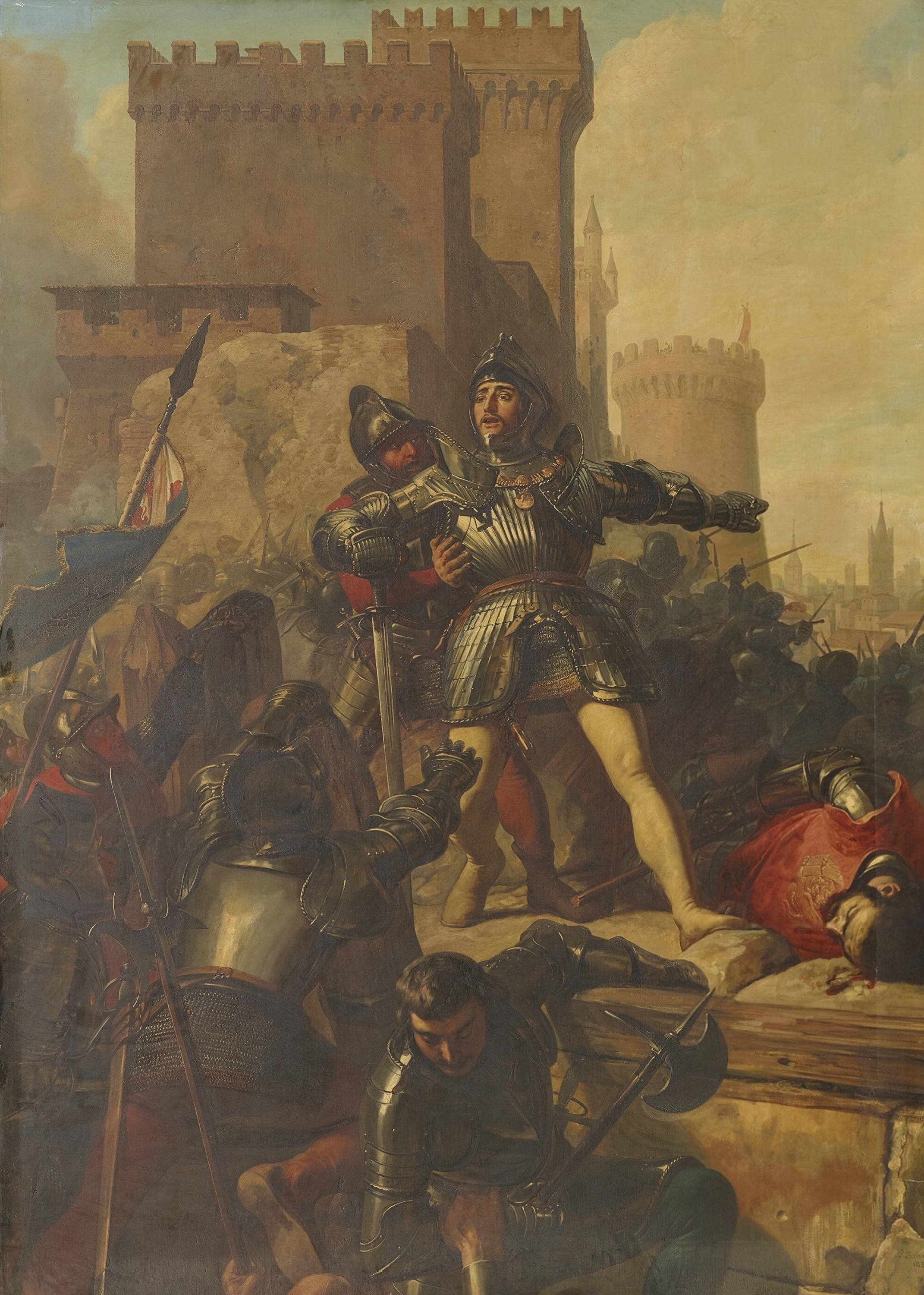
19th-century representation of the Sack of Brescia by Charles-Philippe Larivière

On April 11, 1512, Odet de Foix, commanded the heavy cavalry and gendarmerie wings during the Battle of Ravenna. In the final actions of the battle, coinciding with the death of Gaston de Foix, Odet was overwhelmed and cut down by Spanish Infantry, he was presumed dead after sustaining more than twenty pikes and sword wounds but he was found breathing by his brother, Thomas de Foix-Lescun, and immediately evacuated to a field hospital. Due to his wounds and injuries, he was completely incapacitated for the rest of 1512. Following a prolonged recovery, he returned to active service under Francis I of France. He played an important role in the Franco-Venetian victory at the Battle of Marignano on September 14–15, 1515, which re-established French dominance over the Duchy of Milan and effectively concluded his actions in the war.

=== Governance of Milan (1516–1522) ===
In 1516, King Francis I of France, appointed Odet de Foix, Governor-General of the newly reclaimed, Duchy of Milan. Operating with a massive personal entourage, his administrative tenure was characterized by intense autocratic severity, which quickly alienated the local Italian population and made the French military occupation highly unpopular and opposed by the Milanese population. He returned briefly to France in 1520 to attend the entourage of Francis I of France to the Field of the Cloth of Gold.

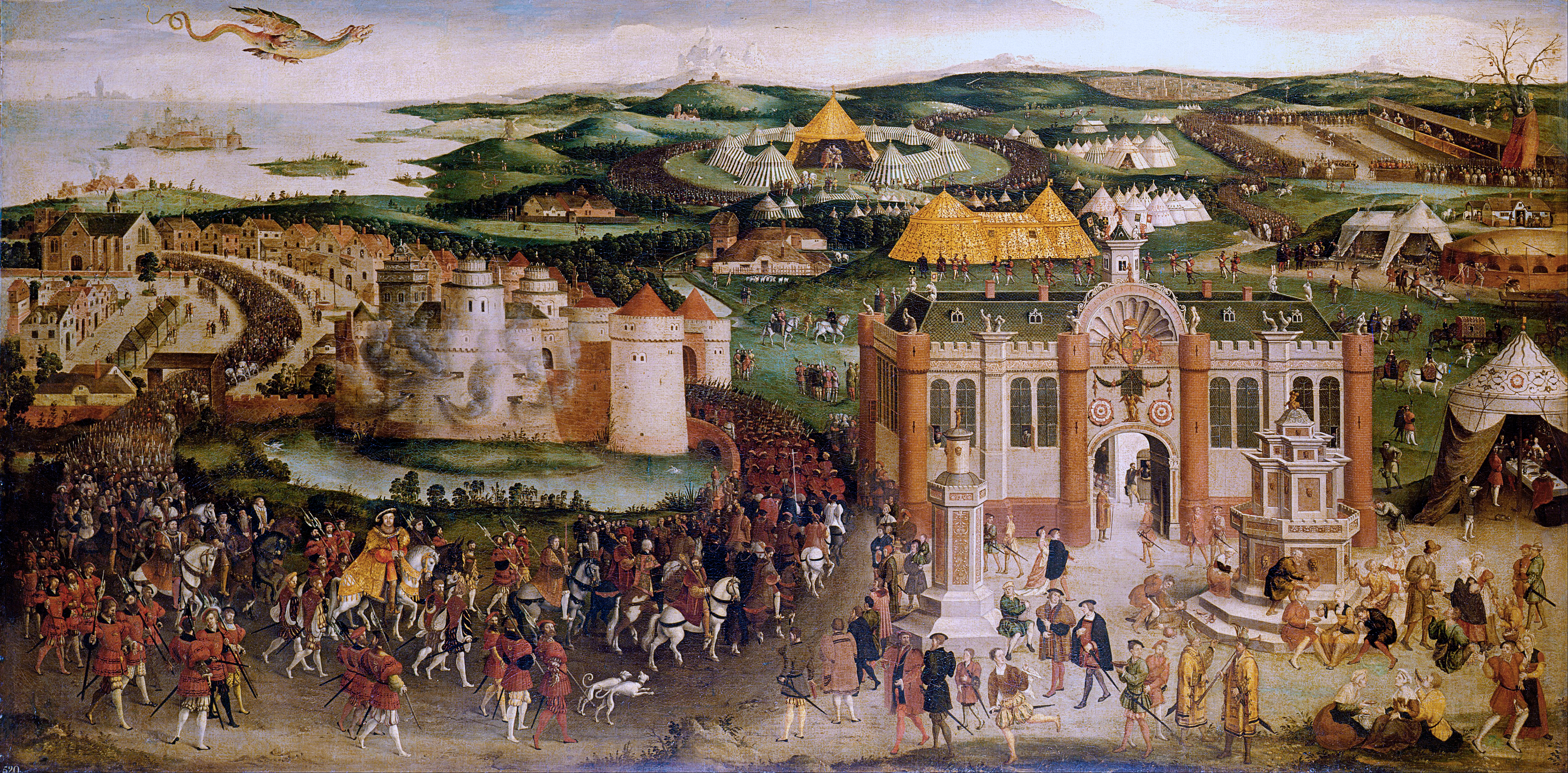
A 16th-century depiction of the Field of the Cloth of Gold, attended by Odet de Foix

He returned in Early 1521, to lay siege to Brescia, forcing the remaining Spanish and German garrisons to surrender in May 26, 1521. The surrender was caused by the dissonance between the two factions, while Brescia was given over to Venetian commissioner, Andrea Gritti. During the start of The Italian Wars of 1521-1526, he was given supreme responsibility for defending French Lombardy from the joint Imperial-Papal Army commanded by Prospero Colonna. In 1521 he succeeded in defending Milan against the Spanish army before the Battle of Vaprio d'Adda. While he successfully checked the initial Spanish advances near Milan prior to the battle, his logistical and strategic positioning soon deteriorated; he was outmaneuvered by Colonna's forces and a gathering Anti-French uprising within the city walls, Foix was driven out of Milan in late November 1521. He was forced to retreat eastward, consolidating his remaining forces in a defensive ring of strongholds along the Adda River, ending his governance in Milan.

=== Operations in Lombardy (Italian Wars 1521–1526) ===
After his military retreat of Lombardy, he established a defensive line along the Adda River to regroup his forces and to wait for his reinforcements. During that time, Foix's mountainous northern flank along the Swiss border came under pressure and harassment from Imperial troops trying to sever his communications. Due to this, Foix directed a series of counter-maneuvers to the Imperial forces known as Operations in Val Vestino. Foix utilized his forces and the terrain of Vestino Valley west of Lake Garda, French detachments and allied Venetian scouts successfully engaged and defeated Imperial Columns and German Landsknechts. These actions by the French and Venetian troops secured the supply lines and the upcoming of a large body of Swiss reinforcements coming for remaining French forces along the Adda River.

In early 1522, Foix launched a massive counter-offensive to retake Milan after consolidating a large fresh contingent of 16,000 Swiss mercenaries. However the counter-offensive stalled due to suffering a financial crisis as the French Royal Treasury failed to send funds, leaving the Swiss mercenary troops unpaid. Growing mutinous, Swiss mercenary captains delivered an ultimatum to Foix, demanding either: receive immediate payment, be allowed to be discharged and to be sent home, or be led into a battle at once.

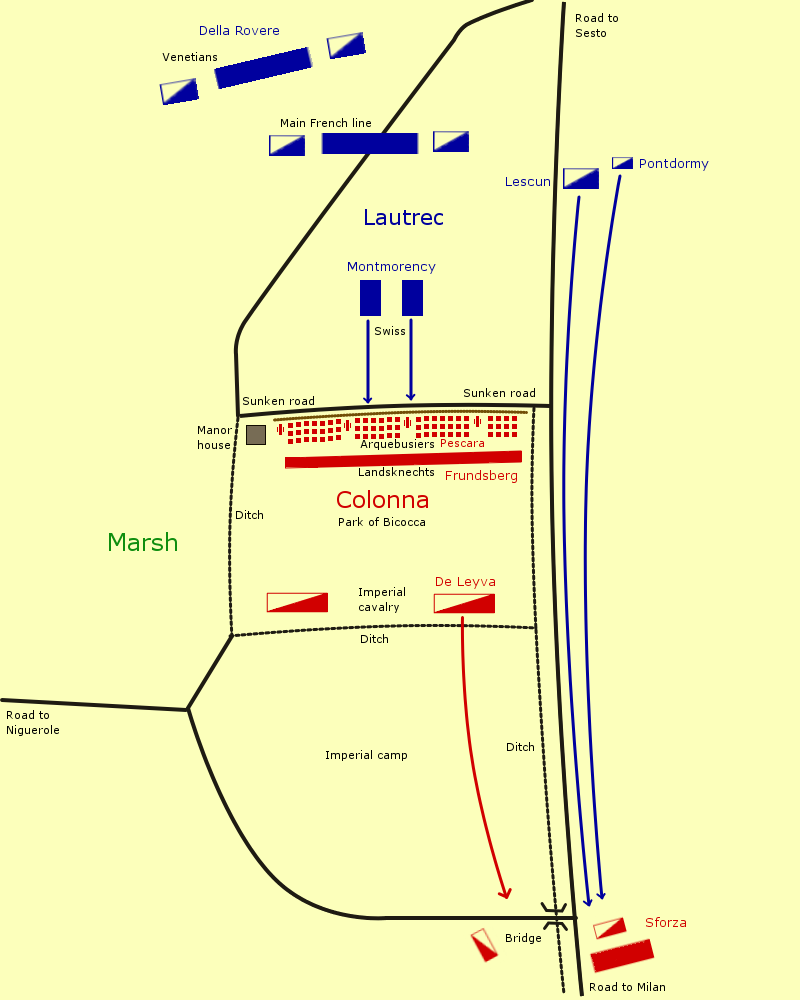
A diagram of the Disaster and Battle of Biccoca

Foix, forced to an unplanned offensive on April 27, 1522, Foix faced the Imperial-Papal army that had established heavily fortified positions at the Manor house of Biccoca, north of Milan. Foix and his artillery commander, Anne de Montmorency, specifically ordered the army to halt for a plan to bombard the opposing forces with superior French Artillery to soften and weaken them but the restless and impatient Swiss Mercenaries launched a blind assault on a sunken road and blocked the artillery lines, when Montmorency rode and ordered the Swiss to halt, the mercenaries ignored him and marched on their own. The charging Swiss forces were decimated by entrenched Spanish arquebusiers, Imperial artillery and German landsknechts as they were trapped in the middle of the fields of Biccoca. The disaster ruined the contemporary reputation of Swiss square pike military invincibility, several surviving Swiss mercenaries fled the army and deserted, forcing Foix to retreat to the alps and back to France. Meanwhile, the Imperial forces of Colonna marched down to Genoa to capture it, since Foix already left, the city surrendered in 1522.

When Odet de Foix returned to France the same year, King Francis I of France was furious and initially refused to meet Foix, blaming him for the loss of French grip of Northern Italy. Foix defended himself and told the truth, he proved the king's mother, Louise of Savoy, and the Royal Treasurer, Jacques de Beaune (Lord of Semblançay), had intercepted the funds for the Swiss mercenaries and caused the disaster, the scandal was so intense, Francis I, executed Jacques de Beaune and reformed the French Royal Treasury, thanks to the intensity of the scandal and the manipulation of Foix's sister, Françoise de Foix, who was the official mistress of Francis I. Foix managed to escape execution or prison and instead, Francis I sidelined him by appointing him Governor of Languedoc.

=== War of the League of Cognac (1526–1530) ===
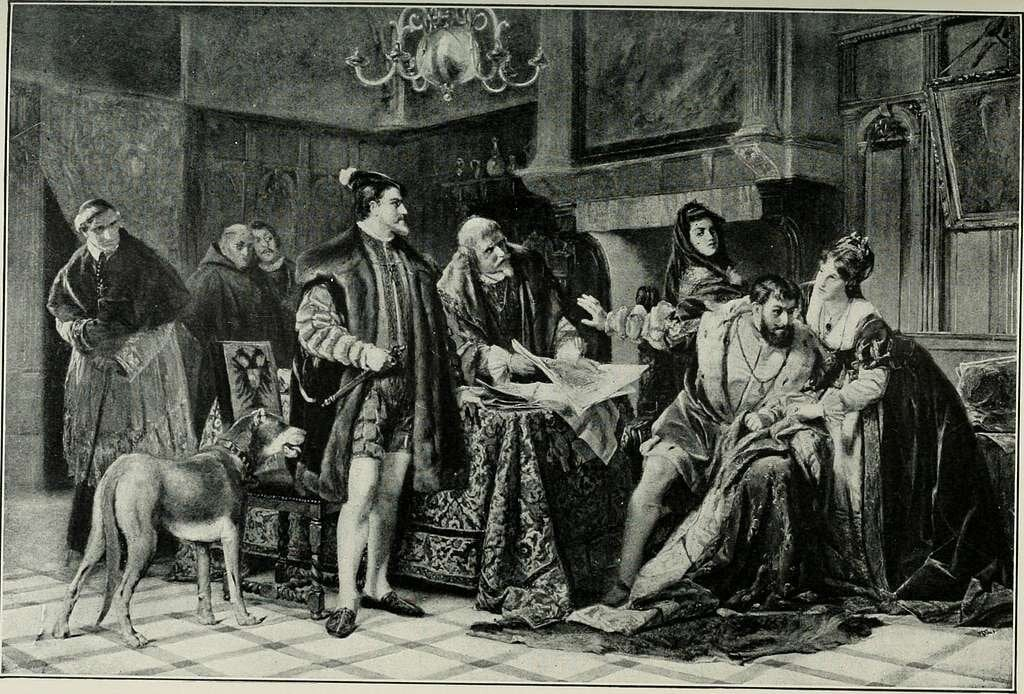
Francis I of France forced to sign the Treaty of Madrid (1526) after being captured by Holy Roman Emperor, Charles V.

Before the League of Cognac existed, King Francis I of France had been captured by the Holy Roman Emperor, Charles V at the Battle of Pavia during the Italian Wars. Desperate for his freedom, Francis I signed the Treaty of Madrid and swore an oath to give up all his claims in Italy, Burgundy, Artois and Flanders, even surrendering his two eldest sons Francis III of Brittany and Henry II of France as hostages in his stead on January 14, 1526. He was then released and allowed to return to France but having crossed the French border at the Bidasoa River he publicly repudiated the treaty, claiming he had signed it under extreme duress and that it was completely invalid. Pope Clement VII absolved the oath of the French king to Charles V, which cleared the path for the War of the League of Cognac.

Pope Clement VII, in realizing the growing success of Charles V in Italy, was deeply concerned and agreed with the Venetian Republic that they needed to drive the Imperial forces out of Italy.

On May 22, 1526, the League of Cognac was formed, consisting of France, the Papal States, Venice, the Republic of Florence and Francesco II Sforza, Duke of Milan.

In early 1527, Charles V's main Imperial army in Northern Italy, was made up of Spanish, Italian and German Protestant Landsknechts. They had been starving, unsupplied and unpaid for months which caused their commanders, Charles III, Duke of Bourbon and Georg von Frundsberg to lose control of the troops.

Frundsberg was so distressed trying to calm down his German landsknechts, he suffered a stroke which proved fatal. The mutinous Imperial army then declared it would abandon the northern front of Italy for the rich undefended southern Italian cities, forcing Charles III either to lead them to Rome or be killed by them.

On May 6, 1527, the mutinous army arrived at Rome, which was largely defenceless. Charles III was killed during the initial assault and the army then slaughtered the Swiss guards, besieged the Pope inside Castel Sant'Angelo and spent the next eight months looting, plundering, raping, killing and destroying the city.

In July 1527, the sack shocked western Christendom and embarrassed Francis I due to his slowness to deploy troops to his Papal ally. He then finally committed France to the war and pulled Odet de Foix from military retirement and made him Captain-General of the grand expedition forces. Francis I's orders to Foix were to march to Italy, restore French honor, and liberate Pope Clement VII, who was still besieged in Castel Sant'Angelo. Foix crossed the Alps in late July or early August but decided instead of marching quickly to Rome that he would secure Lombardy first ensiting the Imperial forces couldn't cut his supply lines from the rear.

His first target was the strategic fortress city of Alessandria in Piedmont. Foix besieged the city and successfully forced it to surrender in late August which re-established a French foothold in Northern Italy. Next Foix turned his eyes to Pavia, the heavily fortified city which still carried emotional weight to the French who had been humiliated by the Spanish 2 years earlier in 1525. On October 1, 1527, Foix besieged the city and after nearly 4 days of French bombardment, breached the walls. On October 5, 1527, Count Ludovico Barbiano di Belgiojoso surrendered to the French, Foix intended to preserve the city but his French soldiers and Venetian allies were bloodthirsty and furious. For over a week, the army initiated the Sack of Pavia massacring Imperial troops and Italian civilians, burning down entire quarters of the city and looting houses in revenge of their 1525 defeat.

With the city of Pavia utterly destroyed, Foix's Italian allies expected him to take the city of Milan, the capital of Lombardy. Foix's Italian allies begged him to besiege the city but he refused as it would take months and drain his forces, gold and time. He knew the Pope was languishing in his besieged state. so he turned south to Rome and rapidly marched his forces to Piacenza, then Parma and continued pushing hard into central Italy. This utter destruction of Pavia had ignited fear in the mutinous Imperial forces in Rome and Foix's rapid advance broke their resolve. They negotiated with Pope Clement VII to strike a deal.

Howrver, on December 6, 1527, the Pope escaped Castel Sant'Angelo disguised as a peddler or servant and escaped from Rome to the League of Cognac's stronghold, Orvieto fearing that the erratic Imperial forces might renege on his initial negotiations with them. Even though the Pope had already fled Rome, Foix continued to march there which made the remaining Imperial forces flee to Naples out of terror of the large French army.

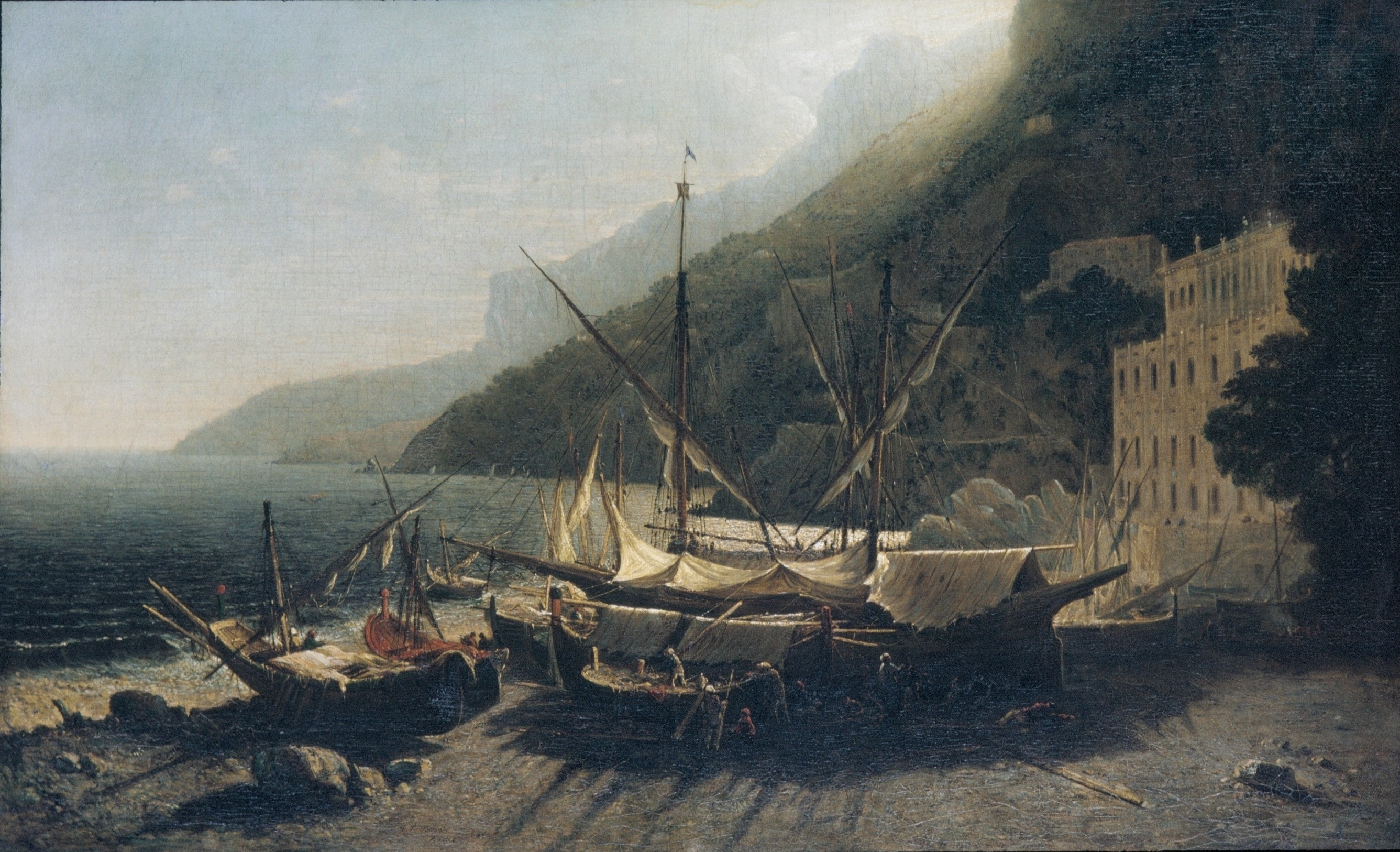
View of the Bay of Salerno where Moncada and Doria battled. By George Loring Brown

Odet de Foix decided to not march to Rome but to the south, the city of Naples, as Rome was already a plague-ridden wasteland with dozens of bodies in the streets and to break Spanish-Imperial control over Naples. As he marched nearer to Naples, Foix encountered minot resistance from Melfi, which he besieged, sacked and massacred 3,000 residents and took the Prince of Melfi in March 1528, which terrified local barons, clearing his path to Naples. On April 1528, Foix has reached Naples and initiated a multi-pronged encirclement campaign. Foix established the main French military camp on a high ridge overlooking city of Poggioreale, the position made locals call it: Monte di Leutrecco or Lo Trecco which was named after him. To fully besiege the city, he relied on his Genoese allies to blockade the ports, who was commanded by Admiral Filippino Doria, nephew of celebrated, Andrea Doria. The early stages of the siege was a massive success for France. The Governor of Naples, Hugo of Moncada, tried to launch a desperate naval breakout to smash the blockade, and initiated the Battle of Capo d'Orso, Doria's forces crushed Moncada and was killed in action while a prominent Imperial noble, Alfonso d'Avalos was captured.

By early summer, French victory seemed certain, but Francis I had heavily insulted the supreme Genoese Admiral, Andrea Doria, by trying to limit Genoa's commercial power and then trying to get Doria arrested. Doria secretly negotiated with the captured noble, Alfonso d'Avalos, resulying in his changing allegiance to Charles V of the Holy Roman Empire in July 1528. Overnight, Doria withdrew the blockade so Imperial ships could sail freely to harbours and resupply the Neapolitan defenders with food and ammunition. He then imposed a new blockade on Odet de Foix's naval communication lines and supply lines.

With supplies running short and the siege dragging on in the tiring summer heat, Foix became desperate. He ordered his military engineers to destroy the ancient fresh water source for Naples, the Bolla Aqueduct, the primary source of water to the city. The choice backfired catastrophically, flooding the French camps and transforming the French trenches into a stagnant, muddy marshland. Due to the summer heat typhus, malaria and dysentery became rampant. Within weeks, the French camp became a massive graveyard. Foix himself contracted typhus, managing the siege from his tent during his final days, dying on August 15, 1528. His body was laid to rest in the Church of Santa Maria la Nova.

Following his death, the Marquis of Saluzzo, Giovanni Ludovico, Foix's second in command, abandoned the siege and retreated due to the French army being leaderless and sick.

== Marriage ==
The Coat of Arms of the Foix-Lautrec lineage.

In 1520, during his governorship in Milan, Odet de Foix married Charlotte d'Albret, Countess of Rethel. She was the daughter of Jean d'Albret, Lord of Orval and Count of Rethel, and Charlotte de Nevers. The matrimonial alliance was highly prestigious, embedding Foix in the powerful House of Albret, a family that held countless estates such as from Aquitaine and sat on the throne of the Kingdom of Navarre. Through his marriage to Charlotte, he became associated with the administration of her inherited titles, including the County of Rethel. Together they established the short-lived, Foix-Lautrec lineage.

The couple's marriage was short-lived as Charlotte died in 1527, leaving Foix as a widower just before his deployment in the War of the League of Cognac. The two had four children together, each having suffered heavy tragedies, resulting in the end of the lineage. The children were:

- Gaston de Foix (1522-1528): The eldest son, died just six years old, the same time his father, Odet de Foix, was dying outside the City of Naples.
- Henry de Foix (1523-1540): The second son, who inherited his father's vast territorial estate such as the title, Count of Comminges. Henry then entered the Catholic church and became the Bishop of Couserans, before dying at the age of seventeen years old.
- Claude de Foix (1526-1549): The only daughter of the couple. Following the deaths of her siblings, she inherited the ancestral title of Vicomtesse de Lautrec (Viscountess of Lautrec). She married twice into prominent French aristocratic houses. Her first husband was Guy XVII, Count of Laval and secondly was Charles de Luxembourg, Vicomte de Martigues. Claude died without any heirs causing the Foix-Lautrec lineage to cease to exist.
- Francis de Foix (1528): The third son, died at infancy or early childhood, the same year with his eldest brother and his father.

== Sources ==
- Armstrong, Alastair (2003). France, 1500-1715. Pearson Education.
- Chisholm, Hugh, ed. (1911). "Lautrec, Odet de Foix, Vicomte de" . Encyclopædia Britannica. Vol. 16 (11th ed.). Cambridge University Press. p. 289.
- Knecht, R.J. (1997). Catherine de'Medici. Routledge.
- Mallett, Michael Edward; Shaw, Christine (2012). The Italian Wars 1494-1559: War, State and Society in Early Modern Europe. Routledge.
- de Pins, Jean (2007). Pendergrass, J.N. (ed.). Letters and letter fragments. Librairie Droz.
- Potter, David (2008). Renaissance France at War: Armies, Culture and Society, C.1480-1560. Boydell Press.
- Soen, Violet (2016). "The Chievres Legacy, the Croy Family and Litigation in Paris. Dynastic Identities between the Low Countries and France (1519–1559)". In Geevers, Liesbeth; Marini, Mirella (eds.). Dynastic Identity in Early Modern Europe: Rulers, Aristocrats and the Formation of Identities. Taylor & Francis.
- Jones, Archer (2001). The Art of War in the Western World. University of Illinois Press.
- Tewes, Götz-Rüdiger (2011). Kampf um Florenz: die Medici im Exil (1494–1512) (in German). Bohlau.
- Walsby, Malcolm (2007). The Counts of Laval: Culture, Patronage and Religion in Fifteenth- and Sixteenth-century France. Ashgate.
- Woodcock, Philippa (2015). "Living like a king? The entourage of Odet de Foix, vicomte de Lautrec, governor of Milan". Royal Studies Journal. 2 (2): 1–24. doi:10.21039/rsj.v2i2.30. ISSN 2057-6730.
