= Battle of Bicocca =

Battle during the Italian War of 1521–26

- Part of the Italian War of 1521–26
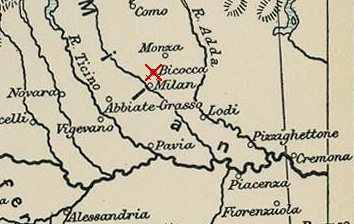
- Lombardy in 1522. The location of the battle is marked.
Date	27 April 1522
Location	Bicocca, Duchy of Milan (present-day Italy) 45.518°N 9.210°E
Result	Imperial–Spanish and Papal victory

Belligerents
Holy Roman Empire; Spain; Papal States; Duchy of Milan	(Kingdom of France) France; Republic of Venice; (Old Swiss Confederacy) Swiss mercenaries

Commanders and leaders
(Holy Roman Empire) (Spain) (Papal States) Prospero Colonna; (Holy Roman Empire) (Spain) Fernando d'Avalos; (Holy Roman Empire) (Spain) Georg von Frundsberg; (Papal States) Francesco Salemone	(Kingdom of France) Odet de Foix; (Kingdom of France) Anne de Montmorency; (Republic of Venice) Andrea Gritti

Strength
18,000+	19,000–31,000+

Casualties and losses
1–200 killed	3,000+ killed
- Location of the battlefield in present-day Lombardy

The Battle of Bicocca or La Bicocca (Italian: Battaglia della Bicocca) was fought on 27 April 1522, during the Italian War of 1521–26. A combined French and Venetian force under Odet de Foix, Vicomte de Lautrec, was decisively defeated by an Imperial–Spanish and Papal army under the overall command of Prospero Colonna. Lautrec then withdrew from Lombardy, leaving the Duchy of Milan in Imperial hands.

Having been driven from Milan by an Imperial advance in late 1521, Lautrec had regrouped, attempting to strike at Colonna's lines of communication. When the Swiss mercenaries in French service did not receive their pay, however, they demanded an immediate battle, and Lautrec was forced to attack Colonna's fortified position in the park of the Arcimboldi Villa Bicocca, north of Milan. The Swiss pikemen advanced over open fields under heavy artillery fire to assault the enemy positions, but were halted at a sunken road backed by earthworks. Having suffered massive casualties from the fire of Imperial-Spanish arquebusiers, the Swiss retreated. Meanwhile, an attempt by French cavalry to flank Colonna's position proved equally ineffective. The Swiss, unwilling to fight further, marched off to their cantons a few days later, and Lautrec retreated into Venetian territory with the remnants of his army.

The battle is noted chiefly for marking the end of the Swiss dominance among the infantry of the Italian Wars, and of the Swiss method of assaults by massed columns of pikemen without support from other troops. Along with the previous encounter in Cerignola, in which Colonna also participated, it was one of the first engagements in which firearms played a decisive role on the battlefield. It has been also proposed that the Spanish arquebusiers performed there the first instance of volley fire in European warfare. Historian John Fortescue described it as, "...if it were necessary to fix an arbitrary date for the first really effective use of small fire-arms in the battlefield, the day of Bicocca might well be selected."

== Prelude ==
At the start of the war in 1521, Holy Roman Emperor Charles V and Pope Leo X moved jointly against the Duchy of Milan, the principal French possession in Lombardy. A large Papal force under Federico II Gonzaga, Duke of Mantua, together with Spanish troops from Naples and some smaller Italian contingents, concentrated near Mantua. The German forces which Charles sent south to aid this venture passed through Venetian territory near Valeggio unmolested; the combined Papal, Spanish, and Imperial army then proceeded into French territory under the command of Prospero Colonna. For the next several months, Colonna fought an evasive war of maneuver against the French, besieging cities but refusing to give battle.

By the autumn of 1521, Lautrec, who was holding a line along the Adda river to Cremona, began to suffer massive losses from desertion, particularly among his Swiss mercenaries. Colonna took the opportunity this offered and, advancing close to the Alps, crossed the Adda at Vaprio; Lautrec, lacking infantry and assuming the year's campaign to be over, withdrew from the subsequent battle to Milan. Colonna, however, had no intention of stopping his advance; he launched a surprise attack on the city, overwhelming the Venetian troops defending one of the walls. Following some abortive street-fighting, Lautrec withdrew to Cremona with about 12,000 men.

By January 1522, the French had lost Alessandria, Pavia, and Como; and Francesco II Sforza, bringing further German reinforcements, had slipped past a Venetian force at Bergamo to join Colonna in Milan. Lautrec had meanwhile been reinforced by the arrival of 16,000 fresh Swiss pikemen and some further Venetian forces, as well as additional companies of French troops under the command of Thomas de Foix-Lescun and Pedro Navarro; he had also secured the services of the condottiere Giovanni de' Medici, who brought his Black Bands into the French service. The French proceeded to attack Novara and Pavia, hoping to draw Colonna into a decisive battle. Colonna, leaving Milan, fortified himself in the monastery of Certosa south of the city. Considering this position to be too strong to be easily assaulted, Lautrec attempted instead to threaten Colonna's lines of communication by sweeping around Milan to Monza, cutting the roads from the city into the Alps.

Lautrec was suddenly confronted, however, with the intransigence of the Swiss, who formed the largest contingent of the French army. The Swiss complained that they had not received any of the pay promised them since their arrival in Lombardy, and their captains, led by Albert von Stein, demanded that Lautrec attack the Imperial army immediately—else the mercenaries would abandon the French and return to their cantons. Lautrec reluctantly acquiesced and marched south towards Milan.

== Battle ==
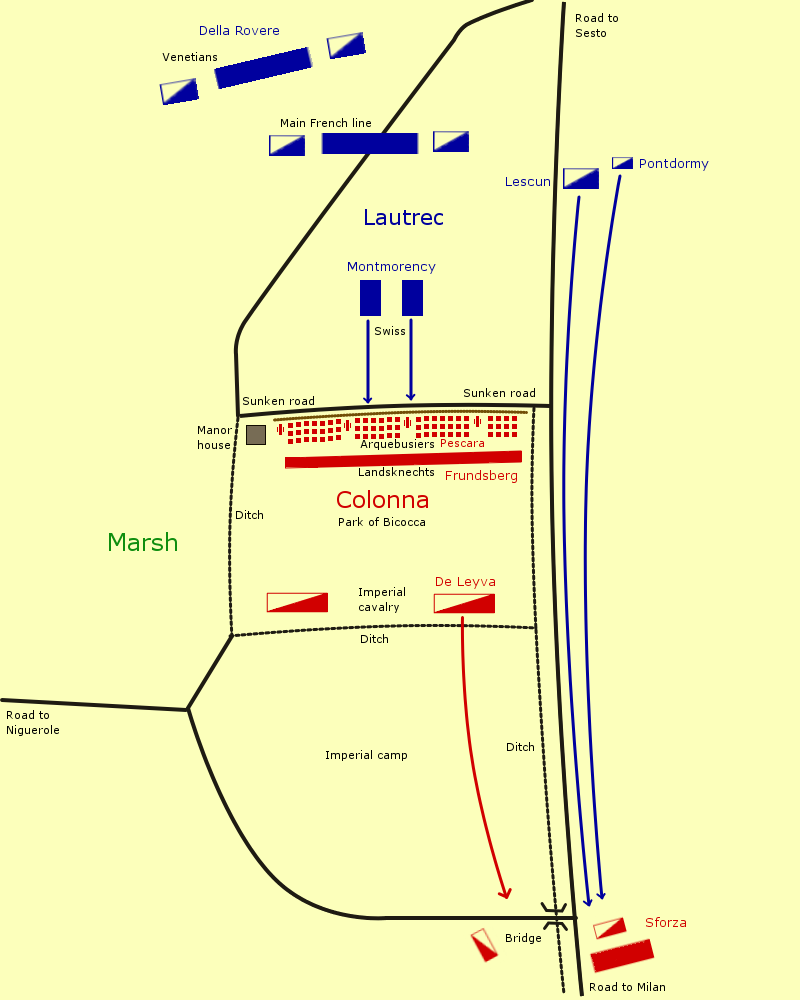
A diagram of the battle. Lautrec's movements are indicated in blue; Colonna's, in red.

=== Dispositions ===
Colonna had meanwhile relocated to a formidable new position: the manor park of Bicocca, about four miles (6 km) north of Milan. The park was situated between a large expanse of marshy ground to the west and the main road into Milan to the east; along this road ran a deep wet ditch, which was crossed by a narrow stone bridge some distance south of the park. The north side of the park was bordered by a sunken road, which Colonna deepened, constructing an earthen rampart on the southern bank.

The entire length of the north side of the park was less than 600 yards (550 m), allowing Colonna to place his troops quite densely; immediately behind the rampart were four ranks of Spanish arquebusiers, commanded by Fernando d'Ávalos, and behind them were blocks of Spanish pikemen and German landsknechts under Georg Frundsberg. The Imperial artillery, placed on several platforms jutting forward from the earthworks, was able to sweep the fields north of the park as well as parts of the sunken road itself. Most of the Imperial cavalry was placed at the south end of the park, far behind the infantry; a separate force of cavalry was positioned to the south, guarding the bridge.

On the evening of 26 April, Lautrec sent a force under the Sieur de Pontdormy to reconnoiter the Imperial positions. Colonna, having observed the French presence, sent messengers to Milan to request reinforcements; Sforza arrived the next morning with 6,400 additional troops, joining the cavalry near the bridge to the south of Colonna's camp.

At dawn on 27 April, Lautrec began his attack, sending the Black Bands to push aside the Spanish pickets and clear the ground before the Imperial positions. The French advance was headed by two columns of Swiss, each comprising about 4,000 to 7,000 men, accompanied by some artillery; this party was to assault the entrenched front of the Imperial camp directly. Lescun, meanwhile, led a body of cavalry south along the Milan road, intending to flank the camp and strike at the bridge to the rear. The remainder of the French army, including the French infantry, the bulk of the heavy cavalry, and the remnants of the Swiss, formed up in a broad line some distance behind the two Swiss columns; behind this was a third line, composed of the Venetian forces under Francesco Maria della Rovere, the Duke of Urbino.

=== The Swiss attack ===
The overall command of the Swiss assault was given to Anne de Montmorency. As the Swiss columns advanced towards the park, he ordered them to pause and wait for the French artillery to bombard the Imperial defences, but the Swiss refused to obey. Perhaps the Swiss captains doubted that the artillery would have any effect on the earthworks; historian Charles Oman suggests that it is more likely they were "inspired by blind pugnacity and self-confidence". In any case, the Swiss moved rapidly towards Colonna's position, leaving the artillery behind; there was apparently some rivalry between the two columns, as one, commanded by Arnold Winkelried of Unterwalden, was composed of men from the rural cantons, while the other, under Albert von Stein, consisted of the contingents from Bern and the urban cantons. The advancing Swiss quickly came into range of the Imperial artillery; unable to take cover on the level fields, they began to take substantial casualties, and as many as a thousand Swiss may have been killed by the time the columns reached the Imperial lines.

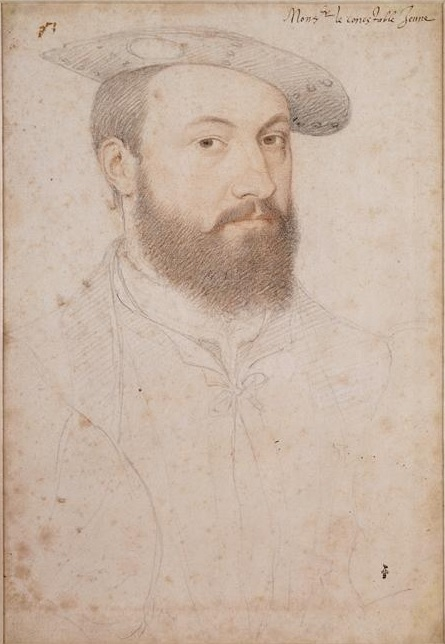
Anne de Montmorency, painted by Jean Clouet (c. 1530). Montmorency commanded the Swiss assault, and was the only survivor among the French nobles who accompanied it.

The Swiss came to a sudden halt as the columns reached the sunken road in front of the park; the depth of the road and the height of the rampart behind it—together higher than the length of the Swiss pikes—effectively blocked their advance. Moving down into the road, the Swiss suffered massive casualties from the fire of d'Avalos's arquebusiers. Sources also imply d'Ávalos arranged his arquebusiers in multiple, successive ranks that would fire and file away to reload while leaving space for the next rank to fire, a novel technique at the time called volley fire. Nevertheless, the Swiss made a series of desperate attempts to breach the Imperial line; some managed to reach the top of the rampart, only to be met by the landsknechts, who had come up from behind the arquebusiers. One of the Swiss captains was apparently killed by Frundsberg in single combat; and the Swiss, unable to form up atop the earthworks, were pushed back down into the sunken road.

After attempting to move forward for about half an hour, the remnants of the Swiss columns retreated back towards the main French line Their total losses numbered more than 3,000, and included Winkelried, von Stein, and twenty other captains; of the French nobles who had accompanied them, only Montmorency survived.

=== Denouement ===
Lescun, with about 400 heavy cavalry under his command, had meanwhile reached the bridge south of the park and fought his way across it and into the Imperial camp beyond. However, more arquebusiers had been placed to defend the bridge, which decimated Lescun's cavalry. Colonna aditionally detached some cavalry under Antonio de Leyva to help halt the French advance, while Sforza came up the road towards the bridge, aiming to surround Lescun. Pontdormy held off the Milanese, allowing Lescun to extricate himself from the camp; the French cavalry then retraced its path and rejoined the main body of the army.

Despite the urging of d'Avalos and several other Imperial commanders, Colonna refused to order a general attack on the French, pointing out that much of Lautrec's army—including his cavalry—was still intact. Colonna suggested that the French were already beaten, and would soon withdraw; this assessment was shared by Frundsberg. Nevertheless, some small groups of Spanish arquebusiers and light cavalry attempted to pursue the withdrawing Swiss, only to be beaten back by the Black Bands, which were covering the removal of the French artillery from the field.

Colonna's judgement proved to be accurate; the Swiss were unwilling to make another assault, and marched for home on 30 April. Lautrec, believing that his resulting weakness in infantry made a further campaign impossible, retreated to the east, crossing the Adda into Venetian territory at Trezzo. Having reached Cremona, Lautrec departed for France, leaving Lescun in command of the remnants of the French army.

== Aftermath ==
Lautrec's departure heralded a complete collapse of the French position in northern Italy. No longer menaced by the French army, Colonna and d'Avalos marched on Genoa, capturing it after a brief siege. Lescun, learning of the loss of Genoa, arranged an agreement with Sforza by which the Castello Sforzesco in Milan, which still remained in French hands, surrendered, and the remainder of the French forces withdrew over the Alps. The Venetians, under the newly elected Doge Andrea Gritti, were no longer interested in continuing the war; in July 1523, Gritti concluded the Treaty of Worms with Charles V, removing the Republic from the fighting. The French would make two further attempts to regain Lombardy before the end of the war, but neither would be successful; the terms of the Treaty of Madrid, which Francis was forced to sign after his defeat at the Battle of Pavia, would leave Italy in Imperial hands.

Another effect of the battle was the changed attitude of the Swiss. Francesco Guicciardini wrote of the aftermath of Bicocca:

They went back to their mountains diminished in numbers, but much more diminished in audacity; for it is certain that the losses which they suffered at Bicocca so affected them that in the coming years they no longer displayed their wonted vigour.

While Swiss mercenaries would continue to take part in the Italian Wars, they no longer possessed the willingness to make headlong attacks that they had at Novara in 1513 or Marignano in 1515; their performance at the Battle of Pavia in 1525 would surprise observers by its lack of initiative.

More generally, the battle made apparent the decisive role of small arms on the battlefield. Although the full capabilities of the arquebus would not be demonstrated until the Battle of the Sesia two years later, where arquebusiers would prevail against heavy cavalry on open ground two, the weapon nevertheless became a sine qua non for any army which did not wish to grant a massive advantage to its opponents. Inspired by the battle, Giovanni delle Bande Nere started training arquebusiers as dragoons, to move on foot and dismounting to fight, a tactic adopted by d'Ávalos. After Giovanni changed sides during the war, he and d'Ávalos would demonstrate it in the Battle of the Sesia.

While the pikeman would continue to play a vital role in warfare, it would be equal to that of the arquebusier; together, the two types of infantry would be combined into the so-called "pike and shot" units that would endure until the development of the bayonet at the end of the seventeenth century. The offensive doctrine of the Swiss—a "push of pike" unsupported by firearms—had become obsolete, and offensive doctrines in general were increasingly replaced with defensive ones; the combination of the arquebus and effective field fortification had made frontal assaults on entrenched positions too costly to be practical, and they were not attempted again for the duration of the Italian Wars.

As a result of the battle, the word bicoca—meaning a bargain, or something acquired at little cost—entered the Spanish language.
