= Battle of Vaprio d'Adda =

Battle during the Italian War of 1521–26

- Part of the Italian War of 1521–26
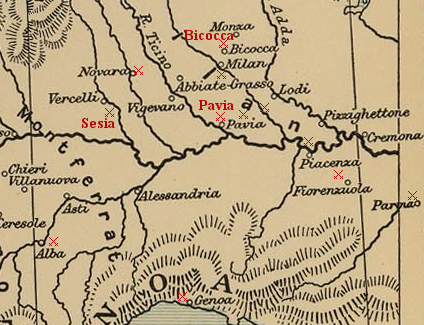
- Lombardy in 1521.
| Date | November 13, 1521 |
| Location | Vaprio d'Adda, Duchy of Milan (present-day Italy) |
| Result | Imperial–Spanish and Papal victory |

Belligerents
| Holy Roman Empire; Spain; Papal States; House of Sforza; Marquisate of Mantua | (Kingdom of France) France; Republic of Venice; (Old Swiss Confederacy) Swiss mercenaries |

Commanders and leaders
| (Holy Roman Empire) (Spain) Prospero Colonna; (Holy Roman Empire) (Spain) Fernando d'Avalos; (Papal States) Giovanni delle Bande Nere; Gian Giacomo Medici; Federico II Gonzaga | (Kingdom of France) Odet de Foix; (Kingdom of France) Thomas de Foix-Lescun; (Kingdom of France) Mercurio Bua; (Republic of Venice) Andrea Gritti |

Casualties and losses
| Minor | Significant |

The battle of Vaprio d'Adda was fought on November 13, 1521 between a Hispano-Imperial and Papal army commanded by Prospero Colonna and a French and Venetian army led by Odet de Foix, Viscount of Lautrec. It was fought for the control of the nearby Duchy of Milan, acquired by King Francis I of France after the Battle of Marignano, but disputed by Pope Leo X and Emperor Charles V. The Imperial and Papal victory in the battle meant the capture of Milan.

== Battle ==
Between November 9 and 10, the Franco-Venetian army, composed by 8,000 infantry and 1,200 cavalry, camped between Truccazzano and Cassano d'Adda and fortified their side of their river with aboundant artillery. On November 11, Colonna, Federico II Gonzaga and Bande Nere had approached their positions and started scouting for a place to cross the river by. After nightfall, Colonna had a contingent of Italian and German soldiers feign an advance towards Treviglio before heading three kilometers north to Rivolta d'Adda, where they planted their artillery and started a firing exchange with the French. In reality, this maneuver was also a feint, conceived to divert the enemy forces and allow the Imperials to cross the river in a move similar to Alexander the Great in the Hydaspes.

On November 13, the Italian and Spanish found Vaprio d'Adda lightly defended and crossed the river in boats. The French had only stationed there a light cavalry company, which was soon overwhelmed. The French cavalry asked for reinforcements from Groppello d'Adda, leading to the arrival of Lescun with 2,400 infantry, 1,000 gendarmes and light artillery, provoking a clash where the Imperial advance seemed to be checked. By night, however, the main Imperial artillery had arrived from Canonica d'Adda and fired on the French lines, which was followed by the cavalry led by Giovanni della Bande Nere and Gian Giacomo Medici, who defeated their French and Venetian counterparts led by Mercurio Bua and Ugo Pepoli. By November 15, Colonna's army had crossed in its entirety and forced the Franco-Venetian army to fall back towards Melegnano.

== Aftermath ==
After the battle, Lautrec and Gritti called all their forces to Milan and tried to defend the city, but when Colonna followed them and started bombarding the city with his artillery, the Milanese citizens turned on the defenders, seeing the chance to expel the French from Milan. Lautrec ordered the city to be evacuated, with many of their soldiers being forced to abandon their weapons and horses to escape. The Milanese then opened the Porta Ticinese and welcomed the Imperials to the city. Francesco II Sforza was installed as new duke, as stipulated by Charles and Leo X.

== Bibliography ==
- Sanuto, Marino (1842). Diarii, vol. 32. Visentini.
- Marchi, Cesare (1981). Giovanni dalle Bande Nere. Milano.
