= Treaty of Bruges (1521) =

Alliance between England and Spain

The Treaty of Bruges (not to be confused with the unrelated 1375 treaty between England and France) was a secret treaty of alliance between England and the Holy Roman Empire signed late in the year 1521 during the Italian War of 1521–26. The treaty sought to establish a date for war with France waged by an Anglo-Habsburg alliance. The treaty was between the English King Henry VIII and Spanish King and Holy Roman Emperor Charles V and signed by representatives of the interested parties and subject to papal agreement. Cardinal Thomas Wolsey was the chief representative for the Kingdom of England and Margaret of Austria, Duchess of Savoy represented the Habsburg interests.

== Terms of the Treaty ==
The treaty was a secret document that detailed plans for a war with France, conducted against them by an Anglo-Habsburg alliance, by March 1523. It demanded that from February 1522 each party was to make allowance for their leaders to be able to move freely across the Channel between England and the Habsburg Low Countries in order to raise money and men for the war. 3000 troops were recommended to complete the task of protecting the movements of Henry VIII and Charles V.

The treaty also entailed a marriage alliance between Charles V and Henry VIII's youngest daughter, Princess Mary. The engagement was repudiated by Charles in 1525, partially with Henry's agreement.

Historian John Guy suggests the treaty detailed for a 'Great Enterprise' to be established between the two allies, as Charles V worked through French possessions in Italy and Henry VIII invaded Northern France itself. Both were to land with an agreed 10,000 cavalry and 30,000 troops, though the treaty makes specific provision for England to be able to use some of Charles V's forces in that figure. The allies were expected to meet their objectives by November or further action was to be taken, namely Papal interdicts. Charles V was even expected to finish his Italian efforts by 15 May 1523.

== Reality of the Treaty ==
Throughout the alliance's lifetime, the relationship between Henry VIII and Charles V was marked by English scepticism after Ferdinand II of Aragon let the English down in 1512. Though 1523 was the suggested start date, a small English expedition, led by the Earl of Surrey, assaulted Picardy in 1522 with little real consequence or notable victories. The offensive's date was delayed until 1524 through the 1522 Treaty of Windsor between Henry VIII and Charles V, possibly to further drain French finances being spent in Italy. In 1525 the 'Great Enterprise' was abandoned and the constantly oscillating foreign policy of Wolsey and Henry switched outlook towards France and away from Spain in the 1525 Treaty of the More.
