= Italian War of 1521–1526 =

Military conflict between France and the Habsburgs

- Part of the Italian Wars
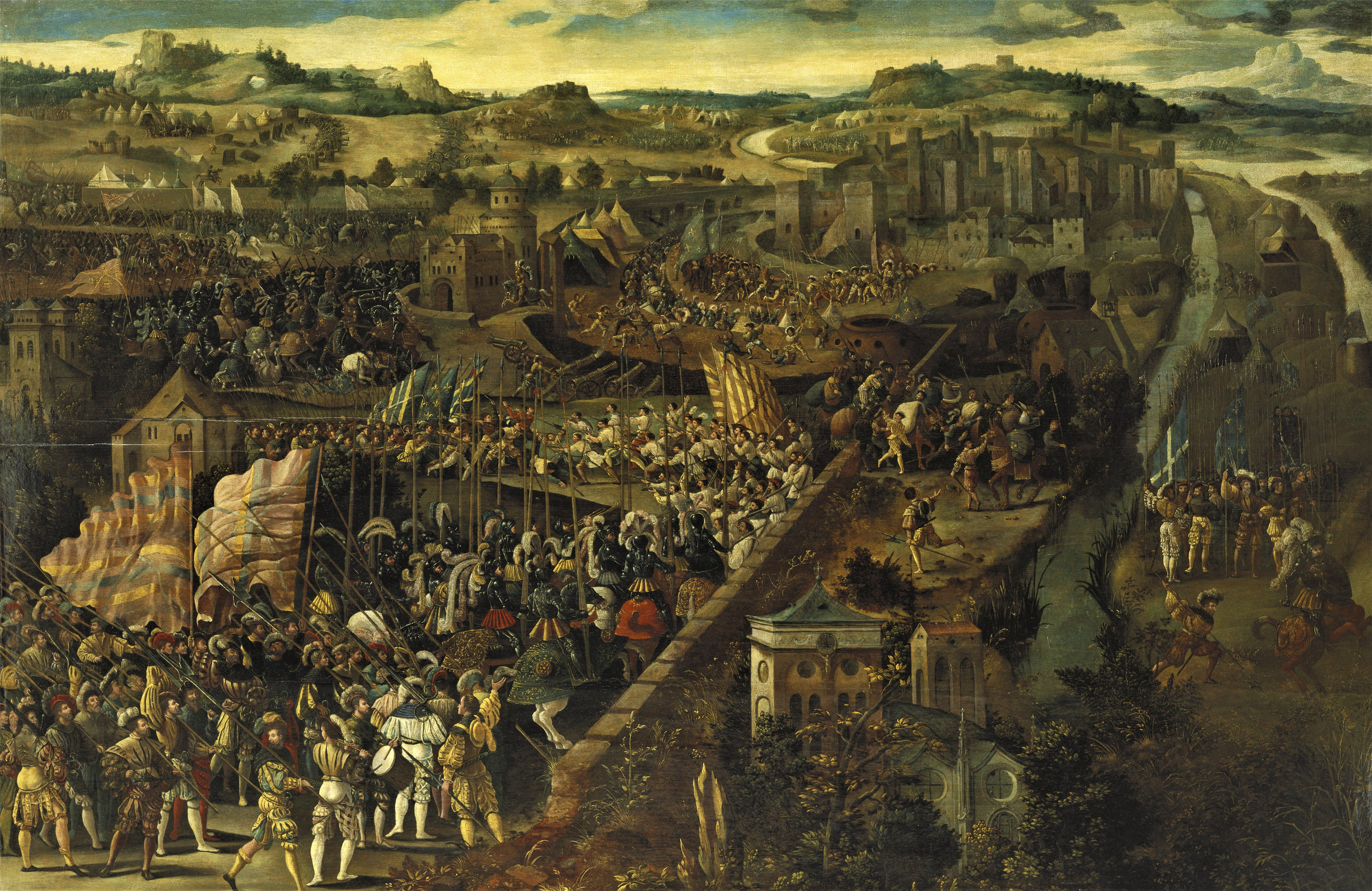
- The Battle of Pavia, by an unknown Flemish artist
| Date | 1521–1526 (5 Years) |
| Location | Italy, France, Low Countries and Spain |
| Result | Habsburg victory: Capture of Francis I of France at the Battle of Pavia; Treaty of Rome (1525) (Note: Francesco II Sforza restored to power in the Duchy of Milan under the protection of Emperor Charles V and Pope Clement VII, who abandons a temporary alliance with Francis I of France.); Treaty of Madrid (1526) (Note: Liberation of Francis I under the condition that France abandons its claims on the Imperial Duchy of Milan and cedes the Duchy of Burgundy to the House of Habsburg.) |

Belligerents
| France; (Old Swiss Confederacy) Swiss mercenaries; Republic of Venice (1521–1523); Papal States (1524–1525); Marquisate of Saluzzo | Holy Roman Empire; Spain; England; Republic of Venice (1523–1526); Papal States (1521–1523 and 1525–1526) |

Commanders and leaders
| (Kingdom of France) Francis I (surrendered); (Kingdom of France) Vicomte de Lautrec; (Kingdom of France) Guillaume de Bonnivet †; (Kingdom of France) Pierre de Bayard †; (Kingdom of France) Robert de La Marck (surrendered); (Kingdom of France) Montmorency (surrendered); (Kingdom of France) Henry II (surrendered); (Kingdom of France) Francois de Lorraine †; (Kingdom of France) Richard de la Pole †; (Kingdom of France) Jacques de la Palice †; (Kingdom of France) Louis La Tremoille †; (Kingdom of France) Duke of Alençon; (Kingdom of France) Duke of Albany; (Kingdom of France) Andrea Doria; (Republic of Venice) Antonio Grimani; (Republic of Venice) Andrea Gritti; Marquess of Saluzzo | (Holy Roman Empire) (Spain) Charles V; (Holy Roman Empire) (Spain) Charles de Lannoy; (Holy Roman Empire) (Spain) Prospero Colonna; (Holy Roman Empire) (Spain) Fernando d'Avalos; (Holy Roman Empire) (Spain) Duke of Bourbon; (Holy Roman Empire) Franz von Sickingen; (Holy Roman Empire) Georg von Frundsberg; (Kingdom of England) Duke of Suffolk; (Republic of Venice) Andrea Gritti |

The Italian War of 1521–1526, sometimes known as the Four Years' War (Note: The name refers to the four years between the beginning of hostilities in 1521 and the Battle of Pavia in 1525, although peace did not come until 1526.) (French: Sixième guerre d'Italie, lit. 'sixth war of Italy'), was a part of the Italian Wars. The war pitted Francis I of France and the Republic of Venice against the Holy Roman Emperor Charles V, Henry VIII of England, and the Papal States. It arose from animosity over the election of Charles as Emperor in 1519–1520 and from Pope Leo X's need to ally with Charles against Martin Luther.

The war broke out across Western Europe late in 1521, when a French–Navarrese expedition attempted to reconquer Navarre while a French army invaded the Low Countries. A Spanish army drove the Navarrese forces back into the Pyrenees, and other Imperial forces attacked northern France, where they were stopped in turn.

In 1521 Charles V and Henry VIII signed the Treaty of Bruges in secret against France, and hostilities resumed on the Italian Peninsula. At the Battle of Bicocca on 27 April 1522, Imperial and Papal forces defeated the French, driving them from Lombardy. Following the battle, fighting again spilled onto French soil, while Venice made a separate peace. The English invaded France in 1523, while the French military leader Charles de Bourbon, alienated by Francis's attempts to seize his inheritance, betrayed Francis and allied himself with the Emperor. The failure of a French attempt to regain Lombardy in 1524 provided Bourbon with an opportunity to invade Provence at the head of a Spanish army.

Francis led a second attack on Milan in 1525. His disastrous defeat at the Battle of Pavia, where he was captured by the Imperial captain Charles de Lannoy and many of his chief nobles were killed, led to the end of the war. Francis was imprisoned in the Lombard city of Pizzighettone and then in Madrid. Diplomatic manoeuvres to obtain his release included a French mission sent by his mother, Louise of Savoy, to the court of Suleiman the Magnificent that resulted in an Ottoman ultimatum to Charles. This unprecedented alignment between Christian and Muslim monarchs caused a scandal in the Christian world, and laid the foundation for the Franco-Ottoman alliance.

Suleiman invaded Hungary in the summer of 1526, defeating Charles' allies at the Battle of Mohács. Despite these efforts, Francis signed the Treaty of Madrid, surrendering his claims to Italy, Artois, Flanders, and Burgundy. A few weeks after his release, he repudiated the terms of the treaty, starting the War of the League of Cognac, during which Charles repulsed Suleiman from the Siege of Vienna. The Italian Wars continued for another three decades, ending with France having failed to regain any substantial territories in Italy.

== Prelude ==
Following the Treaty of London (1518), the major European powers (France, England, Spain, and the Holy Roman Empire) were outwardly friendly towards each other. The treaty pledged them all to come to the aid of any signatory that was attacked, and to unite against any state that broke the peace. They were divided on the question of the Imperial succession; the Holy Roman Emperor, Maximilian I—intending for a Habsburg to succeed him—campaigned throughout 1518 on behalf of his grandson Charles I of Spain, while Francis I of France put himself forward as an alternate candidate. The Papacy and the Holy Roman Empire were forced to cooperate in dealing with the rising influence of Martin Luther, who found support among some Imperial nobles when he opened the way for them to assume authority over their local churches. At the same time, Francis was faced with Henry's able, efficient and intelligent chief advisor Cardinal Thomas Wolsey, the "power behind the throne" who interposed himself into the quarrels of the continent in an attempt to increase both England's influence and his own.

Maximilian's death on 12 January 1519 brought the Imperial election to the forefront of European politics. Pope Leo X, threatened by the presence of Spanish troops 64 kilometres (40 mi) from the Vatican, supported the French candidacy. The election was not a foregone conclusion; with the exception of Frederick of Saxony and Joachim I of Brandenburg, all the electors accepted large bribes from Charles to obtain their votes. Maximilian had already promised sums of 500,000 florins to the prince-electors in exchange for their votes, but Francis offered up to three million florins, and Charles retaliated by borrowing vast sums from the Fugger banking family. The prince-electors all eventually voted for Charles, and he was crowned King of the Romans on 23 October 1520, by which point he already controlled both the Spanish crown and the hereditary Burgundian lands in the Low Countries.

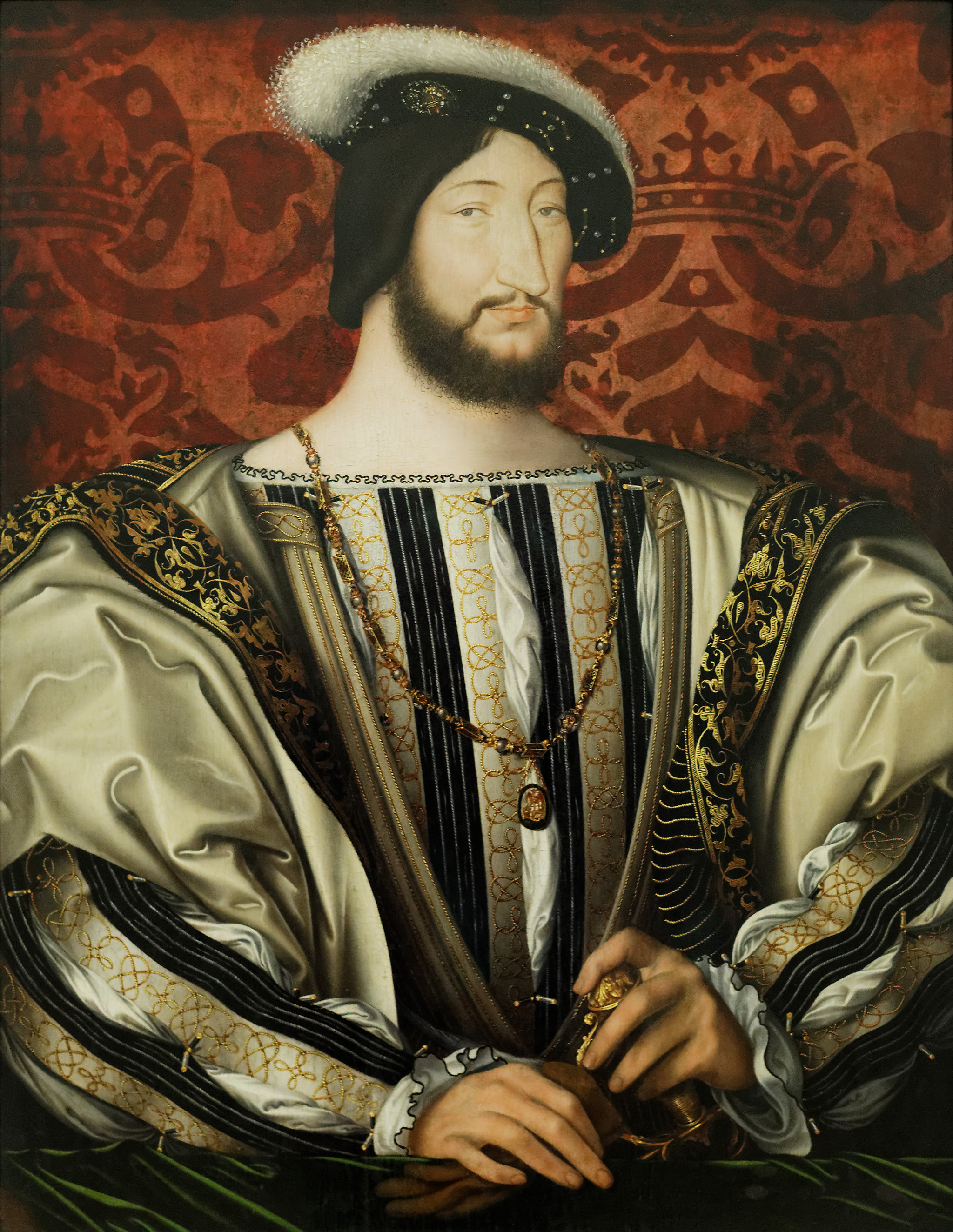
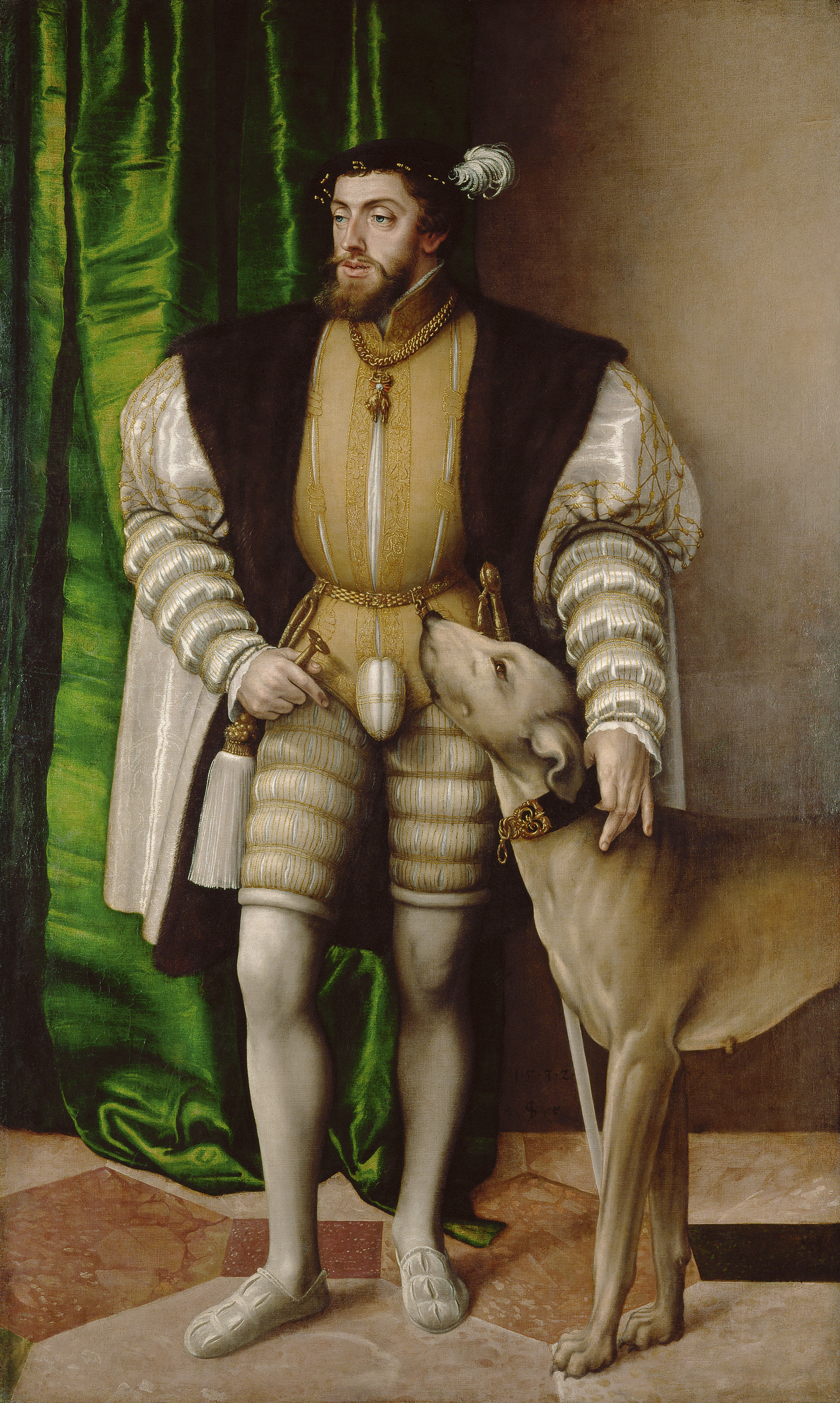
(left) Jean Clouet, Francis I (c.1527), The Louvre; (right) Jakob Seisenegger, Portrait of Emperor Charles V with Dog (1532), Kunsthistorisches Museum

During the autumn of 1521, the English became involved in arbitrating between Spain and France. Henry entertained the emperor in Kent for three days, in a meeting that achieved little, although the Treaty of Windsor (16 June 1522) reaffirmed the alliance between England and Aragon. Henry and Francis staged an extravagant meeting at the Field of the Cloth of Gold throughout June 1520. The following month, Henry sought an agreement with Charles at Gravelines.

Charles was crowned King of the Romans at Aachen in October 1520, but not Holy Roman Emperor, which could only happen if he was crowned by the pope in Rome. To divert Charles—and his army—from entering and possibly taking control of Italy, Francis sought to wage war on the emperor by proxy, and made plans for simultaneous incursions into German and Spanish territory. Luxembourg was attacked under the leadership of Robert de la Marck, whilst a French-Navarrese army simultaneously advanced through Navarre after reconquering St-Jean-Pied-de-Port. The expedition was nominally led by the 18-year-old Navarrese king Henry d'Albret, whose kingdom had been invaded by Ferdinand II of Aragon in 1512, but the army was effectively commanded by André de Foix and funded and equipped by the French. The French plans proved to be flawed, as the intervention of Henry of Nassau drove back the Luxembourg offensive; and although de Foix was initially successful in seizing Pamplona, he was driven from Navarre after being defeated at the Battle of Esquiroz on 30 June 1521.

Charles was meanwhile preoccupied with the issue of Luther, whom he confronted at the Diet of Worms in April 1521. Pope Leo X was unwilling to tolerate open defiance of his own authority, and considered the Emperor as a potential ally to support him against Luther, whose backers included Frederick of Saxony. In May 1521, Charles proclaimed the Edict of Worms against Luther, whilst also aiding the Pope in the return of Parma and Piacenza to Italian authority. Leo, needing the Imperial mandate for his campaign against what he viewed as a dangerous heresy, promised to assist in expelling the French from Lombardy, leaving Francis with only the Republic of Venice for an ally.

== Initial moves (June 1521 – May 1522) ==
On 20 August 1521, the Imperial army under Henry of Nassau invaded northeastern France—an attack made in response to de Marck's attack on Luxembourg. Ardres was overrun, Mouzon was severely damaged after being besieged, and Aubenton was sacked and its inhabitants massacred. The attackers were delayed during the three-week siege of Mézières by the resistance of the French, led by Pierre Terrail, seigneur de Bayard. Francis had time to raise a large army at Reims to relieve Mézières. The town was resupplied a few days before the king's army arrived at the town on 26 September, which was by then largely destroyed. Nassau was forced to withdraw, laying waste to towns along his route of retreat.

Tournai, which had been returned to France by Henry VIII in February 1519 as part of the terms of the Treaty of London, was besieged by Imperial forces. Tournai was left to surrender to the besiegers after Francis's army was ordered to retreat, and later disbanded.

Battles in Lombardy (1521–1525). The engagements at Bicocca, the Sesia, and Pavia are labeled.

A Franco-Navarrese force approached the fortress of Amaiur (Baztan, Navarre), laying siege to the fortress the Castilians had just reinforced. On 3 October 1521 the Castilians capitulated in exchange for free passage to Castile. The troops of Guillaume Gouffier then headed to Labourd and on to Behobia, capturing the fortress of Urantzu. Fuenterrabia, at the mouth of the river Bidasoa on the Franco-Spanish border, was captured later in the month by French-Navarrese troops under Bonnivet and Claude of Lorraine. The French held this advantageous foothold in northern Spain until March 1524.

On 28 November 1521 Charles V and Henry VIII signed in secret the Treaty of Bruges. Odet de Foix, Vicomte de Lautrec, the French governor of Milan, was tasked with resisting the Imperial and Papal forces. Lautrec was outmatched by Prospero Colonna, and by late November 1521 had been forced out of Milan after the Battle of Vaprio d'Adda, retreating to located towns around the Adda river. Lautrec's army was reinforced by Swiss mercenaries. Unable to pay them, he had to give in to their demands to engage the Imperial forces immediately.

On 27 April 1522, Lautrec attacked Colonna's combined Imperial and Papal army near Milan at the Battle of Bicocca. Lautrec had planned to use his superiority in artillery to his advantage, but the Swiss, impatient to engage the enemy, masked his guns and charged against the entrenched Spanish arquebusiers. In the resulting melee, the Swiss were badly mauled by the Spanish and by a force of landsknechts (Germanic mercenaries). Their morale broken, the Swiss returned to their cantons; Lombardy was abandoned. Colonna and d'Avalos, left unopposed, proceeded to besiege Genoa, capturing the city on 30 May.

== France at bay ==
The loss of Lombardy was followed by England entering openly into the conflict, when on 29 May 1522, the English formally declared war on France. Henry VIII and Charles signed the Treaty of Windsor on 16 June 1522. The treaty outlined a joint English-Imperial attack against France. Charles agreed to compensate England for the pensions that would be lost because of conflict with France and to pay the past debts that would be forfeit; to seal the alliance, he also agreed to marry Henry's only daughter, Mary. In July, the English raided Morlaix and in September an English army marched from Calais, burning and looting the countryside in an unsuccessful attempt to engage the French in battle.

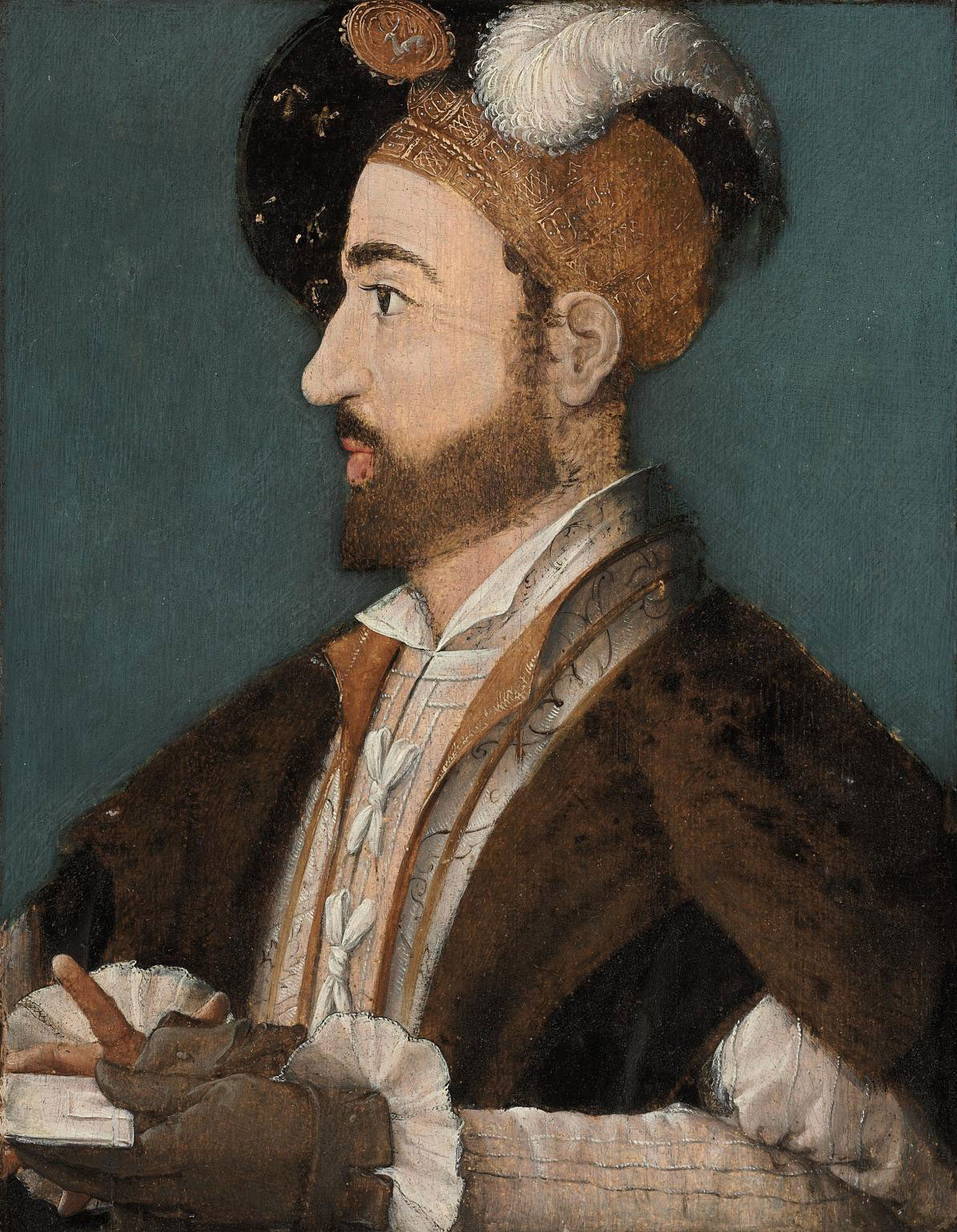
Charles III, Duke of Bourbon, Constable of France (c. 1630)

To raise money, Francis pursued a lawsuit against Charles III, Duke of Bourbon, who had received the majority of his holdings through his marriage to Suzanne, Duchess of Bourbon. After Suzanne's death, Louise of Savoy, her sister and the king's mother, insisted that the territories in question should pass to her because of her closer kinship to the deceased. Francis was confident that seizing the disputed lands would improve his own financial position sufficiently to continue the war and began to confiscate portions of them in Louise's name. Bourbon, angered by this treatment and increasingly isolated at court, sought redress by making overtures to Charles V.

The death of Doge Antonio Grimani brought Andrea Gritti, a veteran of the War of the League of Cambrai, to power in Venice. He quickly began negotiations with the Emperor and on 29 July 1523 concluded the Treaty of Worms, in which the Republic officially switched sides. Bourbon continued his scheming with Charles, offering to begin a rebellion against Francis in exchange for money and German troops. When Francis, who was aware of the plot, summoned him to Lyon in October, he feigned illness and failed to appear. Francis ordered as many of Bourbon's associates as could be captured to be brought to justice after the Duke reached Imperial territory and openly entered the Emperor's service.

Charles then invaded southern France over the Pyrenees. Lautrec successfully defended Bayonne against the Spanish, but Charles was able to recapture Fuenterrabia in February 1524. On 19 September 1523, an English army under the Duke of Suffolk advanced into Picardy from Calais. The French, stretched thin by the Imperial attack, were unable to resist, and Suffolk soon advanced past the Somme, devastating the countryside in his wake and stopping only 80 kilometres (50 mi) from Paris. When Charles failed to support the English offensive, Suffolk—unwilling to risk an attack on the French capital—turned away from Paris on 30 October, returning to Calais by mid-December.

Francis now turned his attention to Lombardy. In September 1523, a French army under Bonnivet advanced through the Piedmont. The Imperial commander, Prospero Colonna, had only 9,000 men to oppose the French advance and was forced to retreat to Milan. Bonnivet overestimated the size of the Imperial army and moved into winter quarters rather than attacking the city; the Imperial commanders were able to summon 15,000 landsknechts and a large force under Bourbon's command by 28 December, when Charles de Lannoy replaced the dying Colonna. Many of the Swiss now abandoned the French army, and Bonnivet began his withdrawal. The French defeat at the Battle of the Sesia, where Bayard was killed while commanding the French rearguard, again demonstrated the power of massed arquebusiers against more traditional troops; the French army then retreated over the Alps in disarray.

D'Avalos and Bourbon crossed the Alps with nearly 11,000 men and invaded Provence in early July 1524. Sweeping through most of the smaller towns unopposed, Bourbon entered the provincial capital of Aix-en-Provence on 9 August 1524, taking the title of Count of Provence and pledging his allegiance to Henry VIII in return for the latter's support against Francis. By mid-August, Bourbon and d'Avalos had besieged Marseille, the only stronghold in Provence that remained in French hands. Their assaults on the city failed and when the French army commanded by Francis himself arrived at Avignon at the end of September 1524, they were forced to retreat back to Italy.

== Francis I's campaign in Italy (October 1524 – February 1525) ==
=== French advance into Lombardy ===
French advances into Lombardy, and the Pavia campaign of 1524–1525 (French movements are in blue)

On 17 October 1524, as Bourbon and Pescara were returning to Genoa, Francis confirmed his mother as regent during his absence. Shortly afterwards, he crossed the Alps and advanced on Milan at the head of an army numbering more than 40,000. Imperialist troops, not yet recovered from the campaign in Provence, were in no position to offer serious resistance.

As the French advanced, the viceroy of Naples retreated from Asti towards Milan. Lannoy, the city's viceroy, who had concentrated 16,000 men to resist the French advance, decided that Milan could not be defended. The city was ridden with the plague, and so to avoid his troops becoming infected, on 26 October he withdrew to Lodi, leaving Milan through one gate as the French vanguard under Salazzo entered through another.

Francis installed Louis II de la Trémoille as the city's governor. At the urging of Bonnivet and against the advice of his other senior commanders, who favoured a more vigorous pursuit of the retreating Lannoy, the king's army then advanced on Pavia, where Antonio de Leyva remained with a sizable garrison. The main mass of French troops arrived at Pavia on 24 October.

=== Siege of Pavia ===
By 2 November, Montmorency had crossed the river Ticino and invested Pavia from the south, completing its encirclement. Inside were about 9,000 men, mainly mercenaries whom Antonio de Leyva was forced to pay by melting down the gold and silver treasures in the city's churches. The French bombardment of Pavia began on 6 November. On 21 November, Francis attempted an assault on the city through two of the breaches but was beaten back with heavy casualties. Hampered by rainy weather and a lack of gunpowder, the French decided to wait for the defenders to starve.

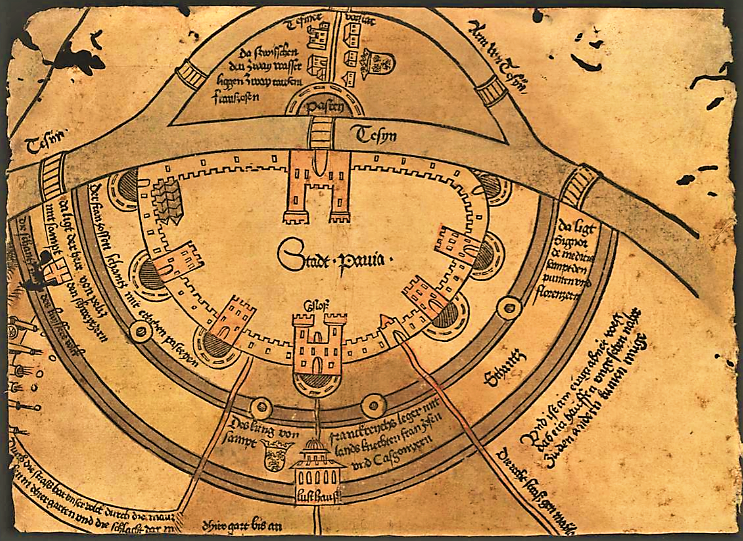
A map of Pavia depicting the town during the siege of 1524–1525, Basel University Library

In early December, a Spanish force commanded by Hugo of Moncada landed near Genoa, intending to intervene in a conflict between pro-Valois and pro-Habsburg factions in the city. Francis dispatched a larger force under Michele Antonio I of Saluzzo to intercept them. Confronted by the more numerous French and left without naval support by the arrival of a pro-Valois fleet commanded by Andrea Doria, the Spanish troops surrendered.

In January 1525, Lannoy was reinforced by the arrival of Frundsberg with fresh landsknechts and cavalrymen, enabling him to renew the offensive. The French outpost at San Angelo was taken, cutting the lines of communication between Pavia and Milan, while a separate column of landsknechts advanced on Belgiojoso and, despite being briefly pushed back by a raid led by Medici and Bonnivet, occupied the town. On 22 January the main imperial army at Lodi simulated an offensive against Milan, which failed to lure away the French. The Imperial commanders marched with 22,000 infantry, 2,300 cavalry, and 17 cannon to Pavia from Lodi on 25 January.

Early in February, a thousand Italian soldiers were defeated at Alessandria before they could reach the French at Pavia. The French position was weakened when Medici returned to Pavia on 8 February and replenished the garrison's supply of gunpowder, gathered by the Duke of Ferrara. It was further weakened by the desertion of 2,000 Germans and the departure of nearly 5,000 Grisons Swiss mercenaries, who returned to their cantons to defend their own region following the capture of the town of Chiavenna by Milanese troops. Francis was encamped along with the majority of his forces in the great walled park of Mirabello outside the city walls, placing them between Leyva's garrison and the approaching relief army. On 4 February an attack on the park was repelled by the French. Skirmishes and sallies by the garrison continued through the month of February. Medici was seriously wounded and withdrew to Piacenza to recuperate, forcing Francis to recall much of the Milan garrison to offset the departure of the Black Band. On 21 February, imperial troops were repelled by the French when they attempted to storm the gates of the park.

=== Albany's advance towards Naples ===
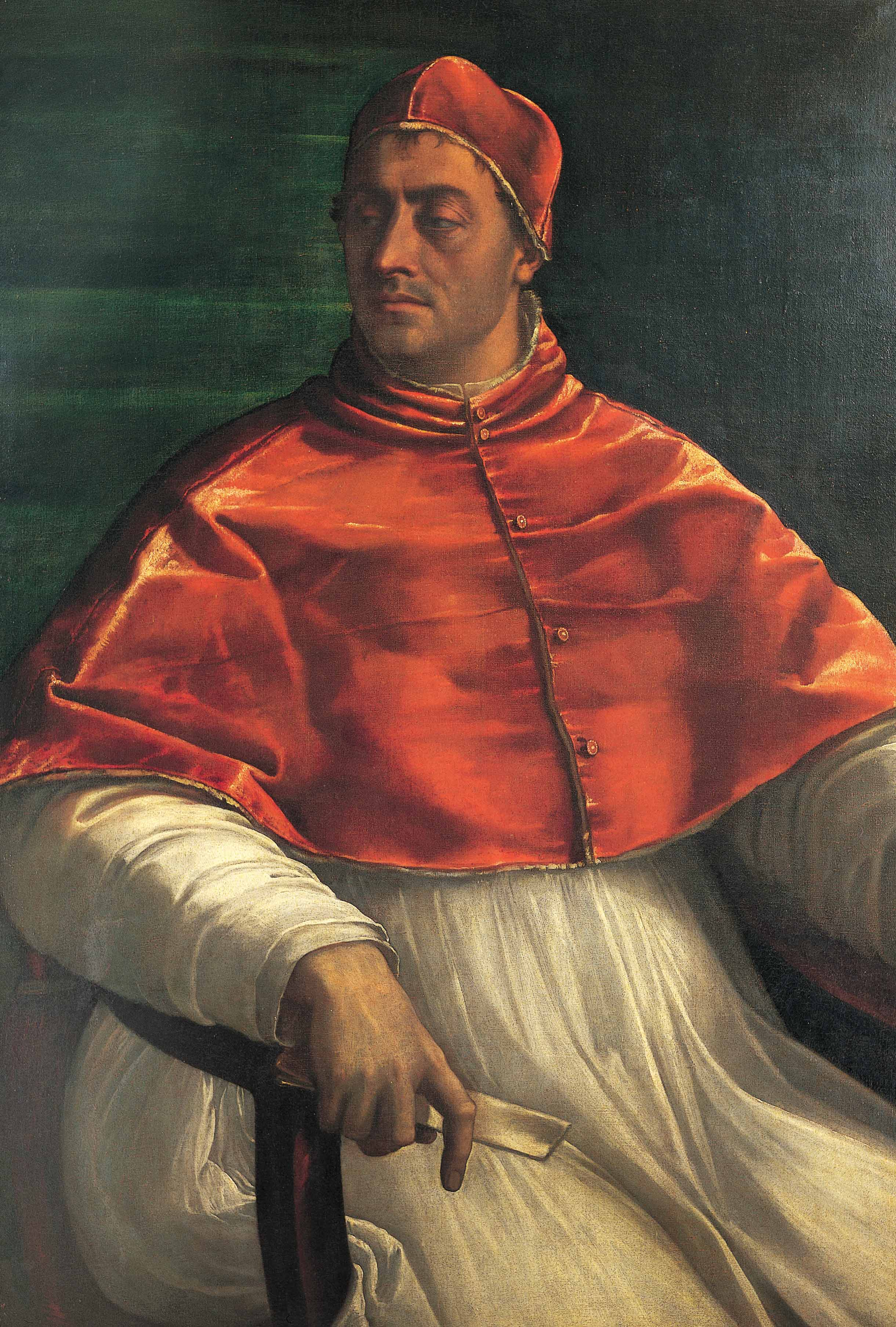
Pope Clement VII (c. 1526), Museo di Capodimonte, Naples

After the failure of a peace mission proposed by Pope Clement VII, Francis and the pope negotiated an alliance in secret. Negotiations were concluded on 12 December 1524, and a secret treaty was signed by the pope on 5 January. Clement pledged not to assist Charles in exchange for Francis's assistance with the conquest of Naples by giving Albany free passage through his lands. In return, Francis promised to cede lands and maintain Medici rule in Florence.

The pope tried to stop Francis from acting immediately, because of the dangers inherent in fighting during the winter months. Against the pope's advice, and the counsel of his own senior commanders, Francis almost immediately detached a portion of his forces under the Duke of Albany, sending 5,000 infantry and 500 cavalry south to aid the pope in the invasion of Naples. The size of the army grew when it was joined by Papal States recruits, and French infantry led by the Italian condottiero (Italian mercenary captain), Renzo da Ceri.

Francis's ploy failed to achieve his aim of leading the Spaniards to abandon northern Italy, as the Imperial commanders ultimately decided not to attack Albany but to concentrate on relieving Pavia. Lannoy attempted to intercept the expedition near Fiorenzuola, but suffered heavy casualties and was forced to return to Lodi by the intervention of the Black Bands of Giovanni de' Medici, which had just entered French service.

=== Battle of Pavia ===
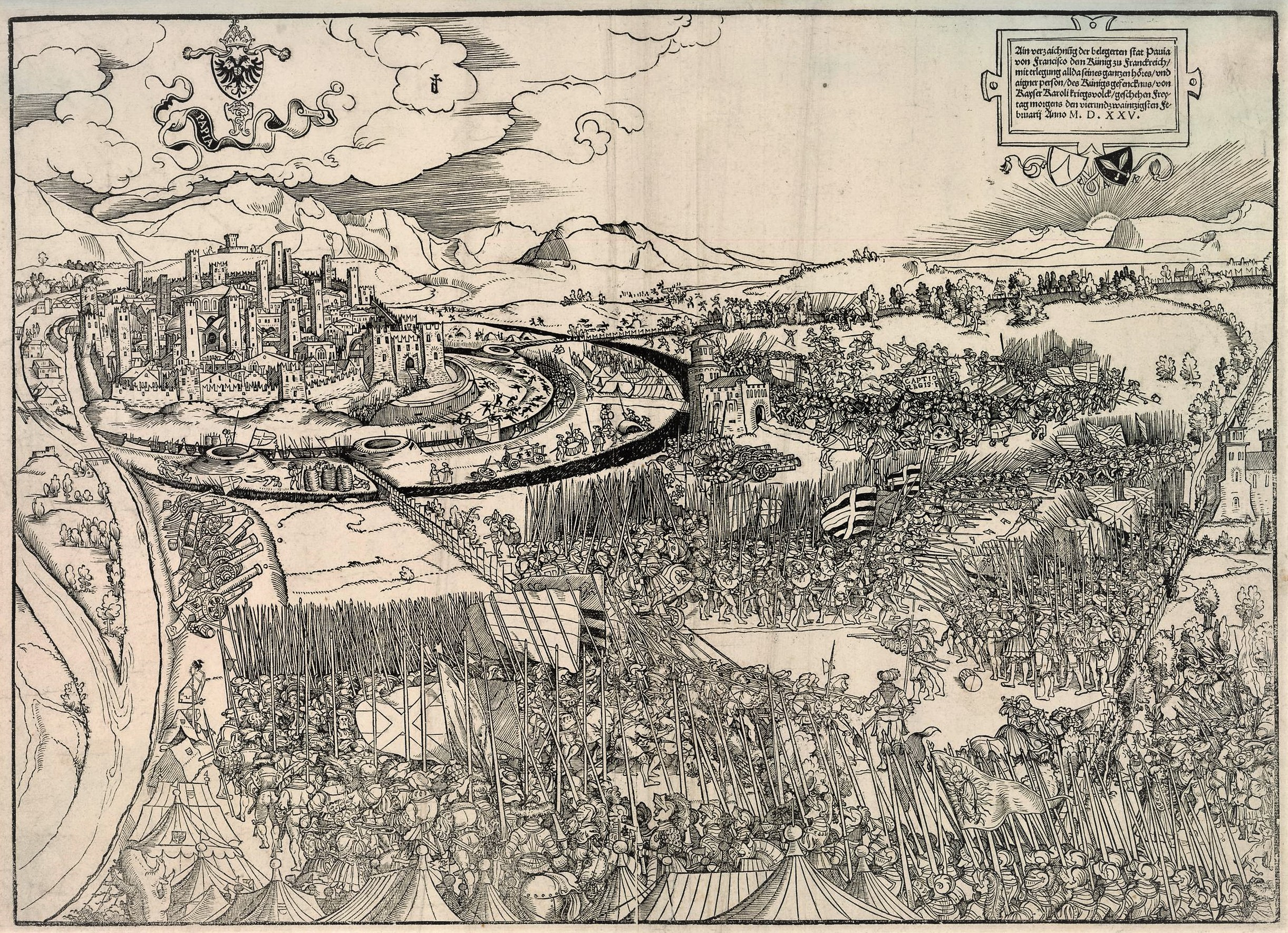
Jörg Breu the Elder's woodcut of the Battle of Pavia (made c.1525), British Museum

On the night of 23 February, Imperial artillery began a bombardment to distract the French, whilst the remainder of the Imperial army moved from their camp to flank the brook that separated the two armies. Ahead of them were sappers, who dismantled part of the park wall as quietly as possible, in an operation that took most of the night. Columns of Imperial soldiers then entered the park.

At the same time, Leyva sortied from Pavia with what remained of the garrison. In the ensuing four-hour battle, the French heavy cavalry masked its own artillery by a rapid advance, (Note: Francis had to order the guns to stop firing when he led a charge across their line of fire.) and was surrounded and cut apart by landsknechts and a thousand massed Spanish arquebusiers, who attacked the French from concealed positions in the park's woodland. The French knights in their suits of armour were shot down with ease, and later butchered with daggers. A series of protracted infantry engagements resulted in the rout of the Swiss and French infantry. The French suffered massive casualties, losing the majority of their army. Bonnivet, Jacques de la Palice, La Trémoille, and Richard de la Pole were killed, while de Montmorency, de la Marck, and Francis himself were taken prisoner along with a host of lesser nobles.

== March 1525 – May 1526 ==
=== Imprisonment and release of Francis I ===
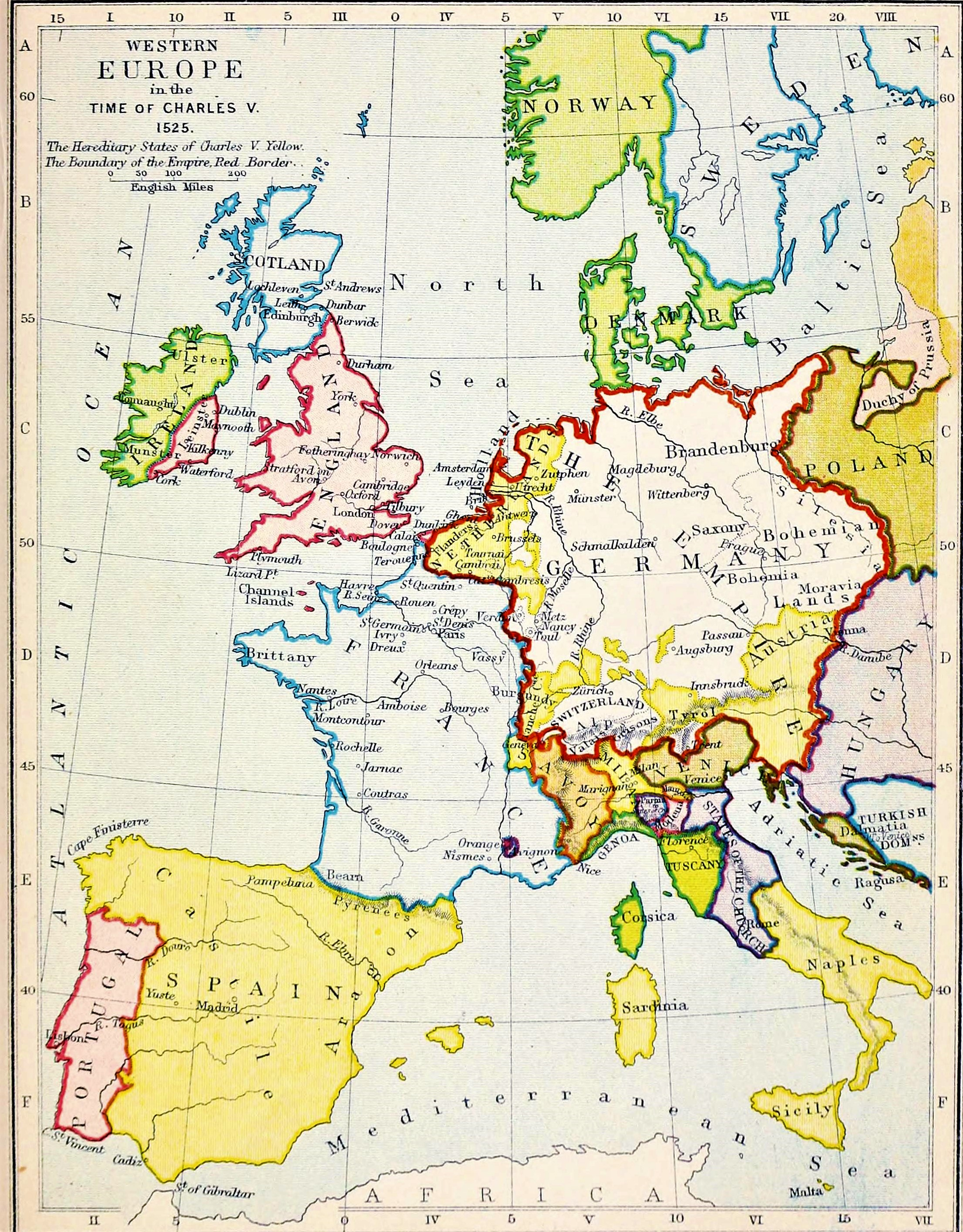
Western Europe in 1525

The night following the Battle of Pavia, Francis gave Lannoy a letter to be delivered to his mother in Paris, in which he related what had befallen him: "To inform you of how the rest of my ill fortune is proceeding, all is lost to me save honour and life, which is safe." The broken remnants of the French forces, aside from a small garrison left to hold the Castello Sforzesco in Milan, retreated across the Alps under the nominal command of Charles IV of Alençon, reaching Lyon by March 1525.

After Pavia, the fate of the French king, and of France itself, became the subject of furious diplomatic manoeuvring. Charles V, lacking funds to pay for the war, sought to marry Isabella of Portugal, who would bring with her a substantial dowry. Bourbon, meanwhile, plotted with Henry to invade and partition France, and at the same time the Milanese chancellor, Girolamo Morone, proposed to d'Avalos that he lead the Italians against their oppressors and seize the Neapolitan crown for himself, although d'Avalos ultimately refused.

Louise of Savoy raised a small army and funds to defend France against an expected attack upon its eastern borders by English troops. She also sent a first French mission to Suleiman the Magnificent, requesting assistance, but the mission was lost on its way in Bosnia. In December 1525 a second mission was sent, led by the Croatian nobleman John Frangipani, which managed to reach Constantinople with secret letters asking for the deliverance of Francis and an attack on the House of Habsburg. Frangipani left Constantinople on 8 February with an answer from Suleiman, that promised nothing.

Francis' captors, concerned he could be rescued by a French military expedition or might escape, decided it would be safer if he was held captive elsewhere. Francis was convinced he would gain his freedom again if he obtained a personal audience with Charles, and pressed Lannoy, who had intended to transport the king to the Castel Nuovo in Naples, to send him to Spain instead. Lannoy agreed, and on 31 May 1525 he was taken by ship from Genoa, having been told he was being taken to Naples. Francis arrived in Barcelona on 19 June.

Francis was initially held at the castle at Tarragona, before being moved to Valencia and then to a nearby villa in Benisanó, but Charles, urged to negotiate a settlement by Montmorency and Lannoy, who suggested that the Italians would soon prove unfaithful to their Imperial alliance, ordered the king brought to Madrid and imprisoned in the citadel there. Charles showed no desire to receive Francis personally. Meanwhile, Henry II of Navarre, who had fought alongside Francis at Pavia and who had been imprisoned in Madrid as well, escaped in December 1525. The Spanish conquest of Iberian Navarre continued, with Charles occupying Navarre and Henry remaining at large following his escape from Imperial captivity.

=== Treaty of Madrid (1526) ===
Charles demanded not only the surrender of Lombardy, but also of Burgundy and Provence, forcing Francis to argue that French law prevented him from surrendering any lands possessed by the crown without the approval of Parlement, which would not be forthcoming. By the beginning of 1526, Charles was faced with demands from Venice and the Pope to restore Francesco II Sforza to the throne of the Duchy of Milan, and had become anxious to achieve a settlement with the French before another war began.

Francis, having argued to retain Burgundy without result, was prepared to surrender it to achieve his own release. On 14 January 1526, Charles and Francis signed and agreed to the Treaty of Madrid. The French king renounced all his claims in Italy, Artois, and Flanders. He surrendered Burgundy to Charles, agreed to send two of his sons to be hostages at the Spanish court, and to restore to Bourbon the territories that had been seized from him. He also agreed to persuade Henry to relinquish the throne of Navarre in favor of Charles "in order to uproot the errors of the Lutheran sect and the rest of condemned sects", and requested to marry Charles' sister Eleanor.

=== Aftermath of the treaty ===
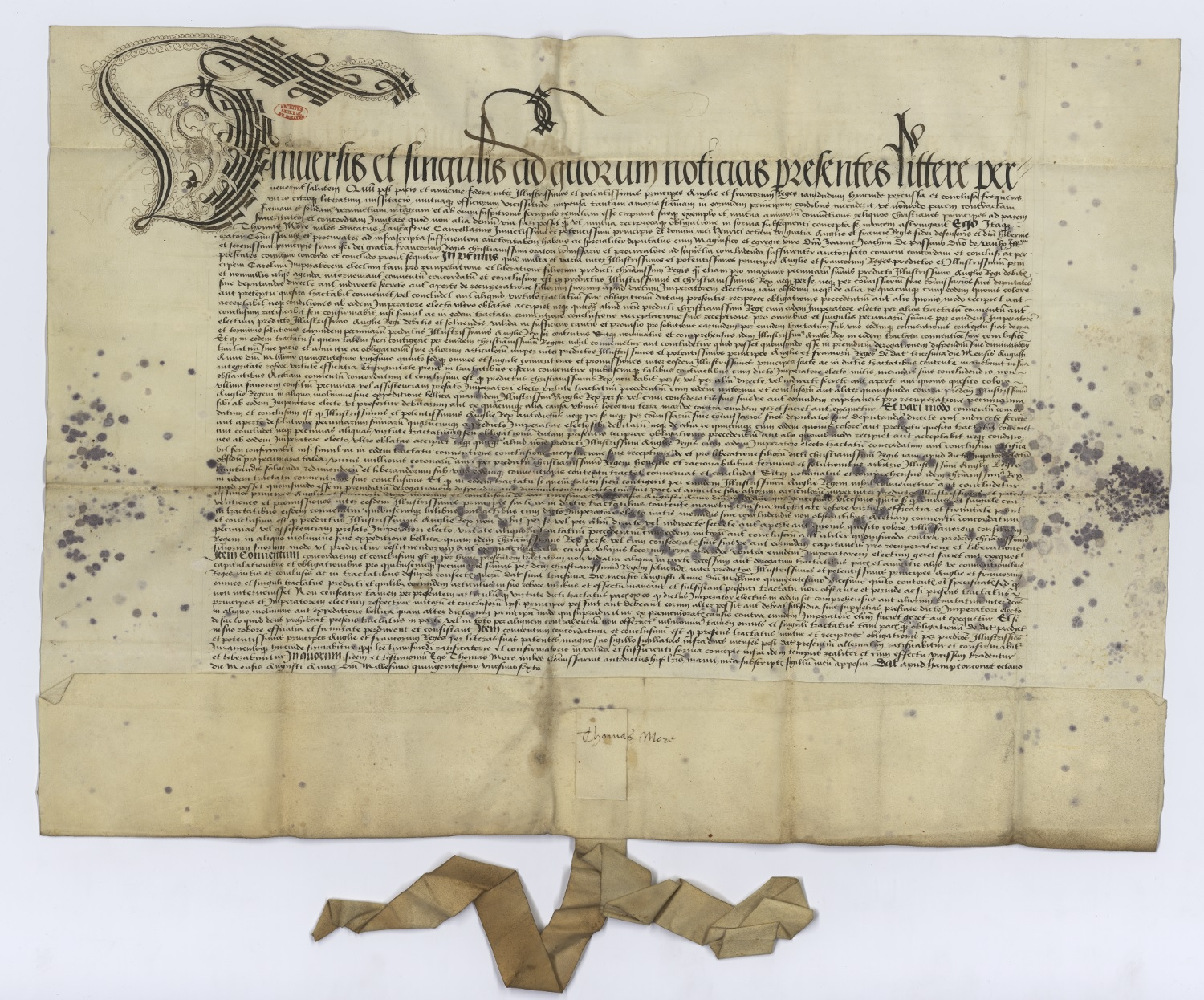
Copy of the Treaty of Hampton Court (1526) in the French archives, signed personally by Thomas More

Francis was released on 6 March. On 17 March, he crossed the Bidasoa north into France, while at the same time the Dauphin and his brother, who had been brought to Bayonne by Louise and Lautrec, crossed into Spain and captivity. By this time, Francis had attained peace with England by the Treaty of Hampton Court; drafted by Wolsey and the French ambassador at Hampton Court Palace. The treaty—in which France and England agreed not to ally with the Empire independently—was signed in August 1526.

Clement VII became convinced that the Emperor's growing power was a threat to his own position in Italy, and Venetian and papal envoys went to Francis suggesting an alliance against Charles. Francis never had any intentions of complying with the remaining provisions of the Treaty of Madrid. On 10 May 1526 the royal council decided to break the treaty. It was made clear that the king would not be bound by the treaty because it had been signed when he was a prisoner under duress to give promises. In June 1526, Francis and the Pope, together with the northern Italian cities of Milan, Venice, Florence and Genoa, launched the War of the League of Cognac at Angoulème in an attempt to reclaim the territory the French had lost to the Empire; Henry, named the 'protector' of the League, was not formally involved.

Francis and his successor, Henry II, would continue to assert their claims to Milan through the remainder of the Italian Wars, only relinquishing them after the Peace of Cateau-Cambrésis in 1559. France failed to regain any former possessions in Lombardy; the terms of the Peace that ended the Italian Wars gave Spain control of Milan, Naples, Sicily, Sardinia, Savoy, and Piedmont.

== Sources ==
- Baring-Gould, Sabine (1907). A Book of the Pyrenees. London: Methuen. OCLC 314911485.
- Baumgartner, Frederic J. (1988). Henry II, King of France 1547-1559. Durham, North Carolina: Duke University Press. ISBN 978-07872-2-174-4.
- Bentley-Cranch, Dana; Marshall, Rosalind K. (2004). "John Stewart, Duke of Albany, Lord Governor of Scotland, and his political role in 16th-century France: a reassessment in the light of new information". Proceedings of the Society of Antiquaries of Scotland. 133. Society of Antiquaries of Scotland: 293–313. doi:10.9750/PSAS.133.293.313. ISSN 0081-1564. S2CID 151146564.
- Black, Jeremy (2002). European Warfare, 1494–1660. London; New York: Routledge. ISBN 978-04152-7-532-3.
- Black, Jeremy (2006). "Dynasty Forged by Fire". The Journal of Military History. 18 (3). Lexington, Virginia: Society for Military History: 34–43. ISSN 1040-5992.
- Blockmans, Wim (2002). Emperor Charles V, 1500–1558. Translated by van den Hoven-Vardon, Isola. New York: Oxford University Press. ISBN 978-0-340-73110-9.
- Brady, Thomas A. (2009). German Histories in the Age of Reformations, 1400–1650. Cambridge: Cambridge University Press. ISBN 978-11394-8-115-1.
- Bustillo Kastrexana, Joxerra (2012). Guía de la conquista de Navarra en 12 escenarios [Guide to the conquest of Navarre in 12 scenarios] (in Spanish). Donostia: Txertoa Argitaletxea. ISBN 978-84-7148-481-9.
- Cadenas, Vicente (1978). La herencia imperial de Carlos V en Italia: el milanesado. Hidalguía. ISBN 978-84-0003-728-4.
- Frieda, Leonie (2018). Francis I: The Maker of Modern France. London: Orion. ISBN 978-14746-0-558-8.
- Giono, Jean (1965). The Battle of Pavia, 24th February, 1525. London: P. Owen. OCLC 1077871340.
- Gunn, S.J. (1986). "The Duke of Suffolk's March on Paris in 1523". The English Historical Review. 101 (400). Oxford: Oxford University Press: 596–634. doi:10.1093/ehr/CI.CCCC.596. ISSN 0013-8266. JSTOR 571478.
- Knecht, Robert J. (1994). Renaissance Warrior and Patron: The Reign of Francis I. Cambridge: Cambridge University Press. ISBN 978-0-521-57885-1.
- Konstam, Angus (1996). Pavia 1525: The Climax of the Italian Wars. Oxford: Osprey Publishing. ISBN 978-1-85532-504-3.
- Mallett, Michael; Shaw, Christine (2014). The Italian Wars, 1494–1559: War, State and Society in Early Modern Europe. Harlow, UK: Pearson Education Limited. ISBN 978-0-582-05758-6.
- Merriman, Roger Bigelow (1944). Suleiman the Magnificent, 1520–1566. Cambridge, Massachusetts: Harvard University Press. OCLC 893213371.
- Monreal, Gregorio; Jimeno, Roldan (2012). Conquista e Incorporación de Navarra a Castilla [Conquest and Incorporation of Navarre into Castile] (in Spanish). Navarra: Pamplona-Iruña Pamiela imp. ISBN 978-84-7681-736-0.
- Mottram, Stewart James (2008). Empire and Nation in Early English Renaissance Literature. Cambridge: D.S. Brewer. ISBN 978-18438-4-182-1.
- Norwich, John Julius (2003). A History of Venice. New York: Vintage Books. ISBN 978-0-679-72197-0.
- Oman, Charles (1937). A History of the Art of War in the Sixteenth Century. London: E.P. Dutton. ISBN 978-0-598-49757-4. OCLC 1025299617.
- Parker, Geoffrey (2019). Emperor: A New Life of Charles V. New Haven, Connecticut; London: Yale University Press. ISBN 978-03002-4-102-0.
- Pastor, Ludwig, Freiherr von (1938). Kerr, Ralph Francis (ed.). The History of the Popes, from the Close of the Middle Ages. Vol. 9 (4th ed.). London: K. Paul. OCLC 977120705.
- Pérez, Joseph (1998) [1970]. La revolución de las Comunidades de Castilla (1520–1521) [The Revolution of the Communities of Castile (1520–1521)] (in Spanish) (6th ed.). Madrid: Siglo XXI de España editores.
- Potter, David (2008). Renaissance France at War: Armies, Culture and Society, c.1480-1560. Woodbridge, Suffolk: Boydell Press. ISBN 978-18438-3-405-2.
- Rowdon, Maurice (1974). The Spanish Terror: Spanish imperialism in the sixteenth century. London: Constable. ISBN 978-0-09-458070-1.
- Setton, Kenneth Meyer (1984). The Papacy and the Levant, (1204-1571). Vol. 3: The Sixteenth Century. Philadelphia: American Philosophical Society. ISBN 978-08716-9-161-3.
- Showalter, Dennis E.; Astore, William J. (2007). The Early Modern World. Soldiers' Lives Through History. Westport, Connecticut: Greenwood Press. ISBN 978-03133-3-312-5.
- Tarver, H. Micheal, ed. (2016). The Spanish Empire: A Historical Encyclopedia. Empires of the World. Vol. 1. Santa Barbara, California; Denver, Colorado: ABC-CLIO. ISBN 978-16106-9-422-3.
- Taylor, Frederick Lewis (1921). The Art of War in Italy, 1494–1529. Cambridge: Cambridge University Press. OCLC 839850873.
- Tucker, Spencer C., ed. (2010). A Global Chronology of Conflict From the Ancient World to the Modern Middle East. Vol. 1. Santa Barbara, California; Denver, Colorado; Oxford: ABC-CLIO. ISBN 978-18510-9-672-5.
- Urzainqui, Tomas (2013). La conquista de Navarra y la reforma europea (in Spanish). Navarra: Pamplona-Iruña Pamiela imp. ISBN 978-84-7681-803-9.
- Wooding, Lucy E. C (2009). Henry VIII. London; New York: Routledge. ISBN 978-04153-3-996-4.
- Zimmerman, T. C. Price (1995). Paolo Giovio :The Historian and the Crisis of Sixteenth-Century Italy. Princeton, New Jersey: Princeton University Press. ISBN 978-14008-2-183-9.
