= Francesco II Sforza =

Duke of Milan from 1521 to 1535

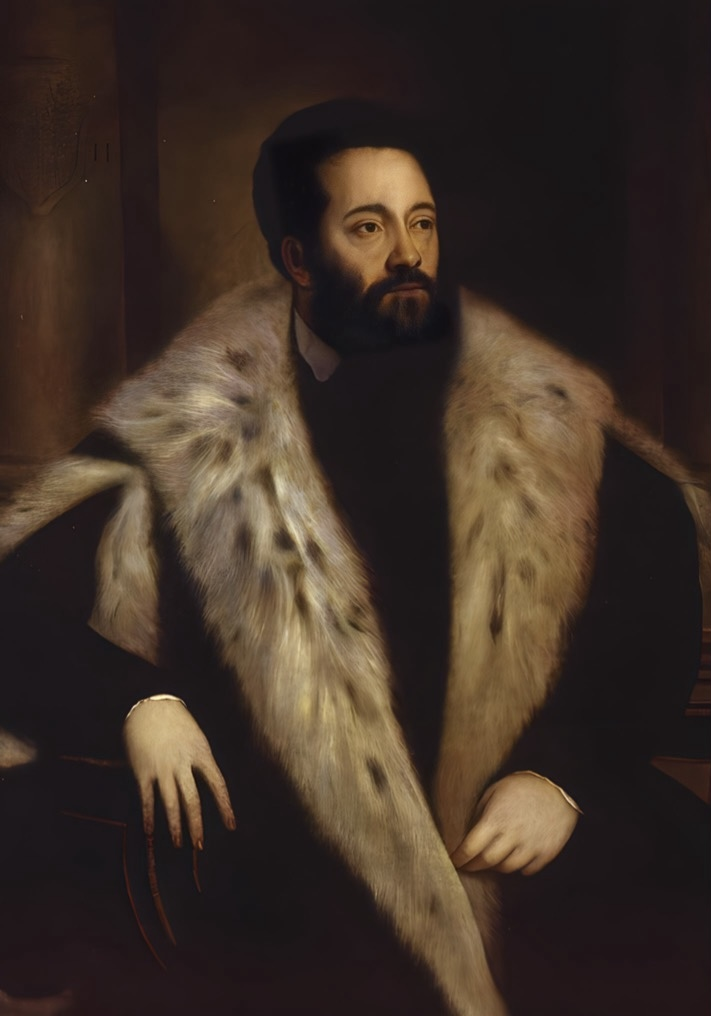
- Portrait by Titian

Duke of Milan
- Reign: 20 November 1521 – 24 October 1535
- Predecessor: Francis I of France
- Successor: Philip II of Spain
- Born: Sforza Francesco Sforza; 4 February 1495; Milan, Duchy of Milan
- Died: 1 November 1535 (aged 40); Milan, Duchy of Milan
- Spouse: Christina of Denmark (m. 1534)
- House: Sforza
- Father: Ludovico Sforza
- Mother: Beatrice d'Este
- Religion: Roman Catholicism

Francesco II Sforza (4 February 1495 – 1 November 1535) was Duke of Milan from 1521 until his death. He became duke after Emperor Charles V reconquered Milan from the French. He fought at the Battle of Bicocca against the French, but in 1526 joined the League of Cognac with Francis I of France. Surviving a poisoning, he married Christina of Denmark, but died childless. He was the last member of the Sforza family to rule Milan.

== Biography ==
Francesco was the second son of Ludovico Sforza and Beatrice d'Este. Following his father's removal from Milan in the course of the Italian Wars, he was brought to the court of the Emperor Maximilian I, who had married Francesco's cousin, Bianca Maria Sforza. Francesco briefly lived at court in Innsbruck, but later was assigned a tutor and lived at the castle of Steyr, along with twenty-one followers. His ambition for an ecclesiastical career, as canon in Cologne, was backed by Maximilian. Despite imperial support, the Cologne chapter rejected him from their chapter.

In August 1512, Francesco placed his judicial studies on hold following his brother Massimiliano's election as duke of Milan at the Diet of Mantua. His conversation with a Mantuan envoy was expressed as, "younger Sforza spoke with Capilupi "with few words", but good ones. He resembles his father, but is less lordly; he will not be as large a person, but is bulkier than the Duke, with full shoulders, hair similar to the Duke’s, and the black clothes of a priest in the German style".

In 1521, Charles V, Holy Roman Emperor, re-conquered Milan from the French after the Battle of Vaprio d'Adda, and Francesco was appointed its duke,, the last of the family to hold that title. His sovereignty, however, remained circumscribed by the military occupation of Milan by Spanish troops. He returned to his state, depleted by twenty years of combat, promoting a cultural and economic recovery. Francesco fought at the Battle of Bicocca, on the side of the emperor, in 1522. In 1526, he switched sides, joining the League of Cognac, together with Francis I of France, Pope Clement VII and the Republic of Florence, and was besieged in the Castello Sforzesco.

On 4 May 1534, Francesco married the 12-year-old niece of Charles V, Christina of Denmark, the daughter of Christian II of Denmark and Isabella of Austria. By this time, Francesco, a survivor of a poisoning attempt, was using a cane to walk and had paralyzed hands. The union remained childless. His death on 1 November 1535, sparked the Italian War of 1535. His half-brother Giovanni Paolo reclaimed the Duchy of Milan briefly after his death, but died in the same year under mysterious circumstances.

== Sources ==
- Aliverti, Maria Ines (2016). "The loose parts of an entry: The flop of Cremona in 1598". In Cremades, Fernando Checa; Fernández–González, Laura (eds.). Festival Culture in the World of the Spanish Habsburgs. Routledge. pp. 115–134.
- Gagné, John (2021). Milan Undone: Contested Sovereignties in the Italian Wars. Harvard University Press.
- Grendler, Paul F. (2002). The Universities of the Italian Renaissance. Johns Hopkins University Press.90
- Mallett, Michael; Shaw, Christine (2012). The Italian Wars:1494-1559. Pearson Education Limited.
- Oman, Charles (1987). A History of The Art of War in the Sixteenth Century. Greenhill Books.
- Pearson, Andrea G. (2008). Women and Portraits in Early Modern Europe: Gender, Agency, Identity. Ashgate.
- Schulin, Ernst (1999). Kaiser Karl V: Geschichte eines übergroßen Wirkungsbereiches (in German). Kohlhammer Verlag.

Regnal titles
Preceded by Francis I of France	Duke of Milan; 1521–1535	Vacant Title next held by Philip II of Spain
