= List of battles of the Italian Wars =

== Italian War of 1494–98 ==
- 5–8 September 1494: Battle of Rapallo
- 17 October 1494: skirmishes near Sant'Agata sul Santerno
- 19–21 October 1494: Siege of Mordano
- 26–29 October 1494: Siege of Fivizzano
- 8–9 November 1494: Florentine revolt against de' Medici
- Mid-November – 28 November 1494: French occupation of Florence
- ? 1495: French conquest and destruction of the Castello di Monte San Giovanni Campano
- ? 1495: French sack of Tuscania (Province of Viterbo)
- 22 February 1495: French capture of Naples
- 2 May 1495: Battle of Rapallo (1495)
- 11 June 1495: French occupation of Novara
- 28 June 1495: Battle of Seminara
- 1 July 1495: Skirmish near Giarolo
- 6 July 1495: Battle of Fornovo
- 6–7 July 1495: Neapolitan recapture of Naples
- 6 July – 8 December 1495: Siege of the Castel Nuovo (Maschio Angioino) in Naples
- 19 July – 21/24 September 1495: Siege of Novara (1495)
- July–August 1496: Siege of Atella
- 1497: Siege of Ostia

== Italian Wars of 1499–1504 ==
Second Italian War (1499–1501)

- September 1499: Venetian invasion of the Duchy of Milan and anti-Sforza revolt inside the city of Milan; the rebels opened the gates to the Venetian army commanded by Gian Giacomo Trivulzio.
- 19 December 1499 – 12 January 1500: Siege of Forlì. Franco-Papal victory by Cesare Borgia over Caterina Sforza.
- 5 February 1500: Ludovico Sforza's Swiss mercenary army retook the city of Milan from the French.
- 21 March 1500: The Sforzescan army retook Novara from the French.
- 8–10 April 1500: Battle of Novara (1500). French victory over Ludovico Sforza.
- 24 July 1501: Sack of Capua.
- 25 July 1501: Franco-Aragonese forces occupied Naples.

Third Italian War (1502–1504)

- 25 December 1502: Battle of Seminara (1502). French victory over Spain.
- 13 February 1503: Challenge of Barletta. Italian knights in Spanish service won a duel against French knights.
- 23 February 1503: Battle of Ruvo. Spanish victory over France.
- 21 April 1503: Battle of Seminara (1503). Spanish victory over France.
- 28 April 1503: Battle of Cerignola. Spanish victory over France.
- 29 December 1503: Battle of Garigliano (1503). Spanish victory over France and Saluzzo.

== War of the League of Cambrai ==
Prelude (1506–1508)

- July 1506 – March 1507: A popular revolt in Genoa expelled the city's pro-French nobility to Savona.
- 22–29 April 1507: Siege of Genoa. French victory over the Genoese revolutionaries.
- Early February 1508: Maximilian declared war on Venice. Venice requested France, then still their ally, to send aid, which Chaumont did in the form of several thousand troops from Milan.
- 20–21 February 1508: Imperial troops invaded Venice, sacking Ampezzo and besieging the Castello di Botestagno.
- 23 February 1508: Imperials captured Pieve di Cadore.
- 24 February 1508: Skirmish at Chiusa di Venas, Imperial victory over Venice.
- 27 February 1508: Imperials captured Castello di Botestagno.
- 2 March 1508: Battle of Cadore. Venetian victory over the Emperor.
- March–May 1508: Successful Venetian counter-offensives into Imperial territory. The Venetians captured Trieste on 6 May.

War of the League of Cambrai proper (1508–1510)

- 14 May 1509: Battle of Agnadello. French (Cambrai) victory over Venice.
- 15–30 September 1509: Siege of Padua. Venetian victory over the League of Cambrai.
- 22 December 1509: Battle of Polesella. Ferrarese (Cambrai) victory over Venice.
- May 1510: French, Ferrarese, and Imperial troops invaded Venice.
- July 1510: The Pope and Venice formed an alliance and went on a counter-offensive.

Ferrarese War (1510–1511)

- August 1510: Failed Papal attack on Ferrara.
- 17 August 1510: Papal–Venetian troops captured Modena.
- October 1510: French troops were repulsed at Bologna.
- December 1510: Papal troops captured Concordia.
- 2–19 January 1511: Siege of Mirandola (1511). Papal victory over Ferrara.
- 23 May 1511: French troops captured Bologna after an anti-Papal revolt.
- Late May 1511: French troops recaptured Mirandola.

War of the Holy League proper (1511–1514)

- 18 February 1512: Sack of Brescia. French victory over Venice. The city of Brescia had revolted against French control, garrisoning itself with Venetian troops. Gaston de Foix, recently arrived to command the French armies in Italy, ordered the city to surrender; when it refused, he attacked it with around 12,000 men. The French attack took place in pouring rain, through a field of mud; Foix ordered his men to remove their shoes for better traction. The defenders inflicted heavy casualties on the French, but were eventually overrun, suffering 8,000 – 15,000 casualties. The Gascon infantry and landsknechts then proceeded to thoroughly sack the city, massacring thousands of civilians over the next five days. Following this, the city of Bergamo paid some 60,000 ducats to the French to avoid a similar fate.
- 11 April 1512: Battle of Ravenna (1512). Franco-Ferrarese victory over the Pope.
- May 1512: Holy League troops drove French troops out of Milan.
- June 1512 – June 1515: Spanish conquest of Iberian Navarre. Spanish victory over Navarre, retreat of the Navarrese monarchs to the principality of Béarn.
- 10 August 1512: Battle of Saint-Mathieu. English victory over France.
- 6 June 1513: Battle of Novara (1513). Milanese–Swiss victory over France.
- 16 August 1513: Battle of the Spurs (Guinegate). Anglo-Imperial victory over France.
- 8–13 September 1513: Siege of Dijon. Swiss victory over France.
- 9 September 1513: Battle of Flodden (Flodden Field, Branxton). English victory over Scotland (allied with France). Scotland abandoned France and left the war.
- 7 October 1513: Battle of La Motta (1513). Spanish and Imperial victory over Venice (allied with France). Also known as the Battle of Schio, Vicenza or Creazzo. A Venetian army under Bartolomeo d'Alviano attempted to prevent the Spanish and Imperials under Ramón de Cardona from withdrawing from the Veneto, but was defeated and scattered.

Francis I's First Italian War (1515–1516)

- 13–14 September 1515: Battle of Marignano (Melegnano). Decisive Franco-Venetian victory over Switzerland and Milan.
- 4 October 1515: French troops captured Milan and dethroned Sforza.

== War of Urbino ==
- January 1517: Siege of Urbino. Urbinate victory over the Pope. Francesco Maria I della Rovere, Duke of Urbino retook Urbino from occupying Papal troops.
- April 1517: Siege of the Mondolfo castle. Urbinate victory over the Pope.
- ? 1517: Battle of Monte Imperiale. Urbinate victory over the Pope.
- ? 1517: Raids in Tuscany and Umbria. Papal victory over Urbino.

== Italian War of 1521–1526 ==
- 20 May 1521: Battle of Pampeluna (also spelled Pamplona). French-backed Navarrese victory over Spanish troops during the Spanish conquest of Iberian Navarre. Most Navarrese towns rose at once against the Spanish, who had invaded Navarre in 1512. The Spanish resisted the siege sheltered inside the city castle, but they eventually surrendered and the French-Navarrese took control of the town and the castle of Pamplona. It was at this battle that Inigo Lopez de Loyola, better known as St. Ignatius of Loyola, suffered severe injuries, a Navarrese cannonball shattering his leg. It is said that after the battle the Navarrese so admired his bravery that they carried him all the way back to his home in Loyola. His meditations during his long recovery set him on the road of a conversion of life from soldier to priest. He would eventually found the Society of Jesus (the Jesuits), and create the Spiritual Exercises, which is the basis for the idea of "retreats" as an experience of prayer as practiced in the Roman Catholic Church.
- 25 May–11 June 1521: Siege of Logroño
- 30 June 1521: Battle of Noáin or Noain-Esquiroz near Pamplona. A makeshift Spanish army consisting mostly of Castilian troops defeated the Navarrese and French forces sent by Henry d'Albret and commanded by Lesparre, driving them out of Iberian Navarre.
- 29 August–12 September 1521. Imperial forces unsuccessfully siege the French in Parma
- ? 1521: Siege of Mézières. An Imperial army besieged the city (now part of Charleville-Mézières), which was defended by French troops under the command of the Chevalier de Bayard and Anne de Montmorency; the siege was unsuccessful, and the determined French resistance gave Francis I time to concentrate his forces against Charles V.
- November 1521: Siege of Tournai. An Imperial army besieged the city of Tournai, capturing it from the French in late November; it would remain a Habsburg possession until the French conquest of the Austrian Netherlands in 1795.
- Operation in Val Vestino (1521)
- Battle of Vaprio d'Adda. Imperial-Spanish and Papal victory over France and Venice.
- 29 April 1522: Battle of Bicocca. Imperial–Spanish and Papal victory over France, Venice and Swiss mercenaries.
- 20–30 May 1522: Siege of Genoa (1522). An army of the Holy Roman Empire under the command of the Italian/Spanish General Fernando d'Avalos and Italian condottiero Prospero Colonna besieged the French forces defending the Italian city. Since Genoa had refused to surrender, the Imperial troops were permitted to loot the city once it had fallen.
- 30 June 1522: Battle of San Marcial. Spanish partisans defeat the French backed Navarrese at Monte Aldabe near Behobia Castle.
- 1523–29 April 1524: Siege of Fuenterrabía (1523–1524). Spanish victory over France and Navarre.
- 30 April 1524: Battle of the Sesia (1524). It was fought near the Sesia River, where the Spanish-Imperial forces under Charles de Lannoy inflicted a decisive defeat on the French under Admiral Bonnivet and the Francis de Bourbon, Comte de St. Pol, forcing the latter to withdraw from Lombardy.
- August–September 1524: Siege of Marseille (1524). Conducted by an Imperial army under Charles de Bourbon (who had recently betrayed Francis I) and Fernando de Avalos against the French defenders of Marseille. Although Avalos heavily looted the surrounding countryside, he was unsuccessful in seizing the city; and, faced with the arrival of French reinforcements, called off the siege in September.
- October 1524 – February 1525: Italian campaign of 1524–1525. Habsburg Imperial-Spanish victory over France.
- 24 February 1525: Battle of Pavia. Decisive Habsburg Imperial-Spanish victory over France; French king Francis I captured.

== War of the League of Cognac ==
- Battle of Camollia
- Papal occupation of the Sienese Maremma
- 25 November 1526: Battle of Governolo (1526)
- Italian campaign of 1527 (North Italy)
- 6 May 1527: Sack of Rome (1527)
- 1–12 October 1527: Sack of Pavia
- 22–23 March 1528: Siege of Melfi
- April – August 1528: Siege of Naples (1528)
- 28–29 April 1528: Battle of Capo d'Orso
- May – 8 August 1528: Siege of Catanzaro
- Neapolitan campaign of 1528 (South Italy).
- Battle of Aversa
- 15 March – 28 May 1529: Siege of Monopoli
- 21 June 1529: Battle of Landriano
- 24 October 1529 – 10 August 1530: Siege of Florence (1529–1530). Habsburg-Papal victory over Florence. End of the Florentine Republic.
- 3 August 1530: Battle of Gavinana

== Italian War of 1536–1538 ==
- March 1536: French invasion of Piedmont.
- 3 April 1536: French army captured Turin.
- July 1536: Habsburg invasion of Provence.
- 13 August 1536: Habsburg army captured Aix-en-Provence.
- August 1536: Franco-Ottoman army and fleet failed to capture Genoa.
- Late 1536: Franco-Ottoman army captured Piedmontese towns.
- Spring 1537: Battles of Lens, Arras, Crécy and Hesdin.
- Summer 1537: Battle of Antipaxos
- 1537: Siege of Corfu.

== Italian War of 1542–1546 ==
- July–August 1542: Siege of Corroy. Guelders-Cleves (allied with France) victory over Imperial-Brabantine army.
- July–September 1542: Siege of Perpignan (1542). Imperial-Spanish victory over France.
- 24 November 1542: Battle of Solway Moss. English victory over Scotland (allied with France).
- 25 July 1543: Battle of Muros Bay. Imperial-Spanish victory over France.
- 6–22 August 1543: Siege of Nice. A combined Franco-Ottoman force attacked and captured the Imperial city of Nice.
- Sack of Düren (1543)
- May 1543: Siege of Landrecies (1543). French victory over Anglo-Imperial army.
- 11 April 1544: Battle of Ceresole. French victory over Hispano-Imperial army.
- 2–4 June 1544: Battle of Serravalle (1544). Imperial-Spanish victory over Italian mercenaries in French service.
- July – 17 August 1544: Siege of Saint-Dizier. The Imperial army of Charles V attacked the French city of St. Dizier at the beginning of its advance into Champagne. Charles V himself joined the siege arrived with an army of 14,100 (including 1600 sappers) on 13 July. Imperial commander René of Châlon, Prince of Orange, was wounded on 14 July and died 15 July. On 23 July French outposts near the besieged town were overrun, but a French army under the command of the Dauphin Henry maintained an observing position at Jalons. On 17 August the town surrendered. Charles elected not to attack the Dauphin's army and instead pressed on to Soissons.
- Sack of Lagny-sur-Marne
- 10 July – 25 September 1544: Siege of Montreuil. French victory over an English-Burgundian (Habsburg) army led by Norfolk and Adrien de Croÿ (count of Roeulx, governor of Flanders and Artois).
- 19 July – 14 September 1544: Sieges of Boulogne (1544–1546) (1st Boulogne). English victory over France.
- October 1544: Sieges of Boulogne (1544–1546) (2nd Boulogne). English victory over France.
- 18–19 July 1545: Battle of the Solent. Indecisive Anglo-French battle.
- July 1545: French invasion of the Isle of Wight. English victory over France.
  - July 1545: Battle of Bonchurch. English victory over France.
  - July 1545: Battle of Beachy Head (1545). English victory over France.

== Italian War of 1551–1559 ==
- 15 August 1551: Siege of Tripoli (1551). Ottomans captured Tripoli from Maltese Knights Hospitaller.
- July 1551 – March 1552: Siege of Mirandola (1551). French victory over Imperial-Spanish-Papal army.
- 5 August 1552: Battle of Ponza (1552). Franco-Ottoman victory over Genoa.
- 19 October 1552 – 2 January 1553: Siege of Metz (1552). French victory over Imperial army.
- 11 April – 20 June 1553: Siege of Thérouanne. Spanish-Imperial victory over France. The Imperials razed Thérouanne to the ground on the orders of Charles V in revenge for the defeat at Metz.
- 1553–1559: Invasion of Corsica (1553). Ottomans & French temporarily occupied most of Corsica.
- 2 August 1554: Battle of Marciano or Scannagallo. Decisive Florentine-Spanish victory over Siena and France.
- 12 August 1554: Battle of Renty. French victory over Imperial army.
- September 1556: Spanish invasion and occupation of the Papal States.
- 20 April - 15 May 1557: Siege of Civitella. The French unsuccessful siege the Spanish.
- 10–27 August 1557: Battle of St. Quentin (1557). Hispano-Savoyard-English victory over France.
- September 1557: Spanish occupation of the Papal States.
- 1–8 January 1558: Siege of Calais (1558). French victory over England.
- 17 April – 23 June 1558: Siege of Thionville (1558). French victory over Imperial-Spanish army.
- 13 July 1558: Battle of Gravelines (1558). Anglo-Spanish victory over France.
