= Portrait of Joseph Banks =

Portrait of Joseph Banks may refer to

- Portrait of Joseph Banks (Stubbs), a 1764 painting by George Stubbs
- Portrait of Joseph Banks (West), a 1772 portrait by Benjamin West
- Portrait of Joseph Banks (Reynolds), a 1773 painting by Joshua Reynolds
- Portrait of Joseph Banks (Lawrence), an 1806 painting by Thomas Lawrence
