= Italian campaign of 1524–1525 =

Part of the Italian War of 1521–1526

- Part of the Italian War of 1521–1526
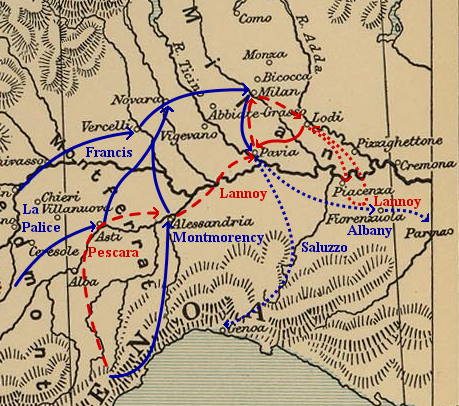
- The French advance into Lombardy and the Pavia campaign of 1524–1525. French movements are indicated in blue and Imperial movements in red.
Date	October 1524 – February 1525
Location	Northern Italy
Result	Habsburg victory

Belligerents
France	Holy Roman Empire; Spain

Commanders and leaders
Francis I of France (POW); Seigneur de Bonnivet †; Anne de Montmorency (POW)	Charles de Lannoy; Fernando d'Avalos; Charles de Bourbon; Antonio de Leyva

The Italian campaign of 1524–1525 was the final significant action of the Italian War of 1521–1526 launched by the French into Northern Italy. Led by Francis I of France, the French attempted to dislodge the Habsburgs from Italy in an attempt to control Italy for themselves. After the French invaded Lombardy, the campaign would then primarily consist of the French attempt to capture the city of Milan. However, after Francis's defeat at the Siege of Pavia, the French were driven out of Italy and Francis was taken prisoner.

== Prelude ==
The French, in possession of Lombardy at the start of the Italian War of 1521, had been forced to abandon it after their defeat at the Battle of Bicocca in 1522. Determined to regain it, Francis ordered an invasion of the region in late 1523, under the command of Guillaume Gouffier, Seigneur de Bonnivet; but Bonnivet was defeated by Imperial troops at the Battle of the Sesia and forced to withdraw to France.

Charles de Lannoy now launched an invasion of Provence under the command of Fernando d'Avalos, Marquess of Pescara, and Charles III, Duke of Bourbon (who had recently betrayed Francis and allied himself with the Emperor). While initially successful, the Imperial offensive lost valuable time during the Siege of Marseille and was forced to withdraw back to Italy by the arrival of Francis and the main French army at Avignon.

== French invasion of Lombardy ==
In mid-October, Francis himself crossed the Alps and advanced on Milan at the head of an army numbering more than 40,000. Bourbon and d'Avalos, their troops not yet recovered from the campaign in Provence, were in no position to offer serious resistance. The French army moved in several columns, brushing aside Imperial attempts to hold its advance, but failed to bring the main body of Imperial troops to battle. Nevertheless, Charles de Lannoy, who had concentrated some 16,000 men to resist the 33,000 French troops closing on Milan, decided that the city could not be defended and withdrew to Lodi on 26 October. Having entered Milan and installed Louis II de la Trémoille as the governor, Francis (at the urging of Bonnivet and against the advice of his other senior commanders, who favored a more vigorous pursuit of the retreating Lannoy) advanced on Pavia, where Antonio de Leyva remained with a sizable Imperial garrison.

== Siege of Pavia ==
The main mass of French troops arrived at Pavia in the last days of October. By 2 November, Montmorency had crossed the Ticino and invested the city from the south, completing its encirclement. Inside were about 9,000 men, mainly mercenaries whom Antonio de Leyva was able to pay only by melting the church plate. A period of skirmishing and artillery bombardments followed, and several breaches had been made in the walls by mid-November. On 21 November, Francis attempted an assault on the city through two of the breaches, but was beaten back with heavy casualties; hampered by rainy weather and a lack of gunpowder, the French decided to wait for the defenders to starve.

== French expeditions ==
In early December, a Spanish force commanded by Hugo of Moncada landed near Genoa, intending to interfere in a conflict between pro-Valois and pro-Habsburg factions in the city. Francis dispatched a larger force under the Marquis of Saluzzo to intercept them. Confronted by the more numerous French and left without naval support by the arrival of a pro-Valois fleet commanded by Andrea Doria, the Spanish troops surrendered. Francis then signed a secret agreement with Pope Clement VII, who pledged not to assist Charles in exchange for Francis's assistance with the conquest of Naples. Against the advice of his senior commanders, Francis detached a portion of his forces under the Duke of Albany and sent them south to aid the Pope. Lannoy attempted to intercept the expedition near Fiorenzuola, but suffered heavy casualties and was forced to return to Lodi by the intervention of the infamous Black Bands of Giovanni de' Medici, which had just entered French service. Medici then returned to Pavia with a supply train of gunpowder and shot gathered by the Duke of Ferrara; but the French position was simultaneously weakened by the departure of nearly 5,000 Grisons Swiss mercenaries, who returned to their cantons in order to defend them against marauding landsknechts.

== Lannoy's offensive ==
In January 1525, Lannoy was reinforced by the arrival of Georg Frundsberg with 15,000 fresh landsknechts and renewed the offensive. D'Avalos captured the French outpost at Sant'Angelo Lomellina, cutting the lines of communication between Pavia and Milan, while a separate column of landsknechts advanced on Belgiojoso and, despite being briefly pushed back by a raid led by Medici and Bonnivet, occupied the town. By 2 February, Lannoy was only a few miles from Pavia. Francis had encamped the majority of his forces in the great walled park of Mirabello outside the city walls, placing them between Leyva's garrison and the approaching relief army. Skirmishing and sallies by the garrison continued through the month of February. Medici was seriously wounded and withdrew to Piacenza to recuperate, forcing Francis to recall much of the Milan garrison to offset the departure of the Black Band; but the fighting had little overall effect. On 21 February, the Imperial commanders, running low on supplies and mistakenly believing that the French forces were more numerous than their own, decided to launch an attack on Mirabello Castle in order to save face and demoralize the French sufficiently to ensure a safe withdrawal.

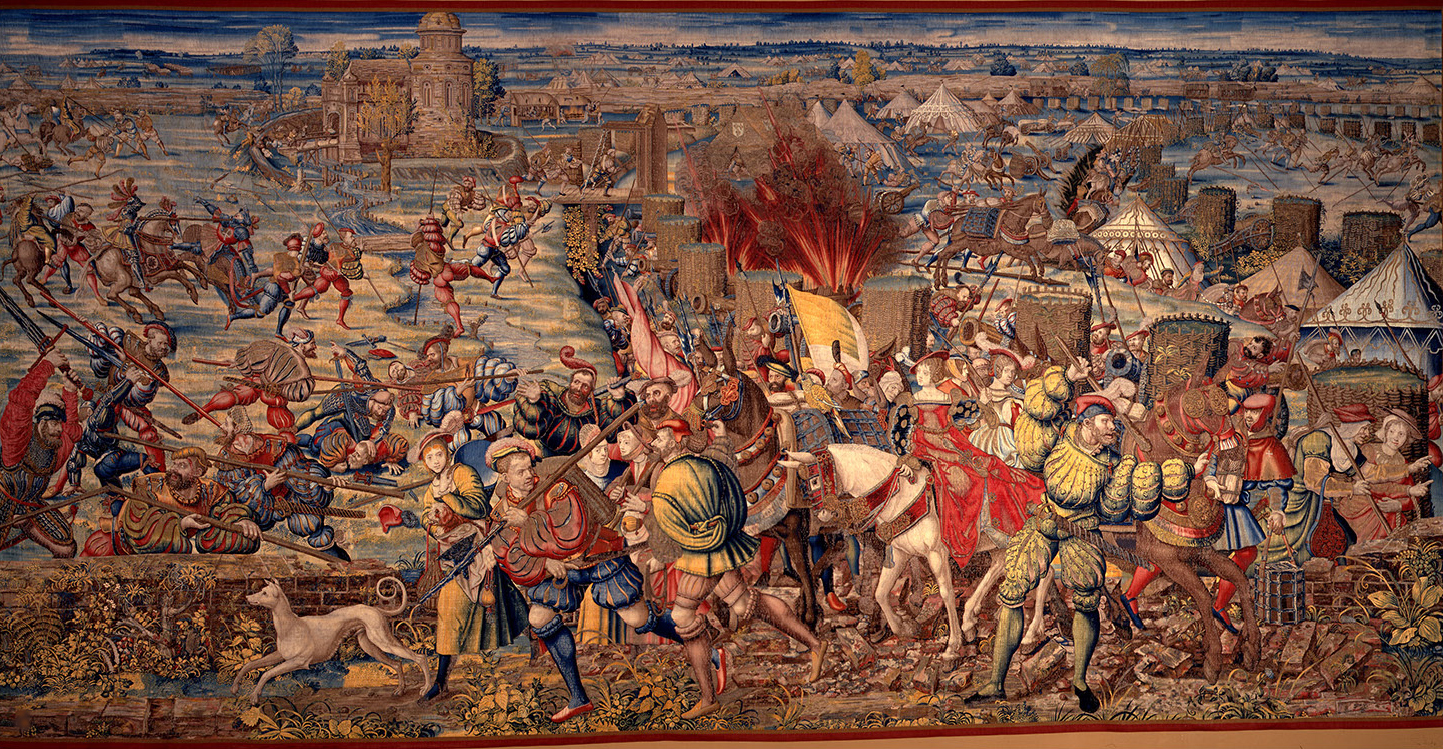
Part of The Pavia Tapestry by Barnaert van Orley (c. 1531).

== Battle of Pavia ==
In the early morning of 24 February 1525, Imperial engineers opened breaches in the walls of Mirabello, allowing Lannoy's forces to enter the park. At the same time, Leyva sortied from Pavia with what remained of the garrison. In the ensuing four-hour battle, the French heavy cavalry, which had proven so effective against the Swiss at Marignano ten years prior, masked its own artillery by a rapid advance and was surrounded and cut apart by landsknechts and d'Avalos's massed Spanish arquebusiers. Meanwhile, a series of protracted infantry engagements resulted in the rout of the Swiss and French infantry. The French suffered massive casualties, losing the majority of their army. Bonnivet, Jacques de la Palice, La Trémoille, and Richard de la Pole were killed, while Anne de Montmorency, Robert de la Marck, and Francis himself were taken prisoner along with a host of lesser nobles. The night following the battle, Francis gave Lannoy a letter to be delivered to his mother in Paris, in which he related what had befallen him: "To inform you of how the rest of my ill-fortune is proceeding, all is lost to me save honour and life, which is safe." Soon afterwards, he finally learned that the Duke of Albany had lost the larger part of his army to attrition and desertion, and had returned to France without ever having reached Naples. The broken remnants of the French forces, aside from a small garrison left to hold the Castel Sforzesco in Milan, retreated across the Alps under the nominal command of Charles IV of Alençon, reaching Lyon by March.

== Aftermath ==
After Pavia, the fate of the French king, and of France herself, became the subject of furious diplomatic maneuvering. Charles V, lacking funds to pay for the war, decided to forgo the marriage into the House of Tudor which he had promised Henry VIII and sought instead to marry Isabella of Portugal, who would bring with her a more substantial dowry. Bourbon, meanwhile, plotted with Henry to invade and partition France, and at the same time encouraged d'Avalos to seize Naples and declare himself King of Italy. Louise of Savoy, who had remained as regent in France during her son's absence, attempted to gather troops and funds to defend against an expected invasion of Artois by English troops. Francis, convinced that he would regain his freedom if he could obtain a personal audience with Charles, pressed d'Avalos and Lannoy, who had intended to transport the king to the Castelnuovo in Naples, to send him to Spain instead. Concerned by Bourbon's scheming, they agreed and Francis arrived in Barcelona on 12 June.
