= The Death of Chevalier Bayard =

Painting by Benjamin West

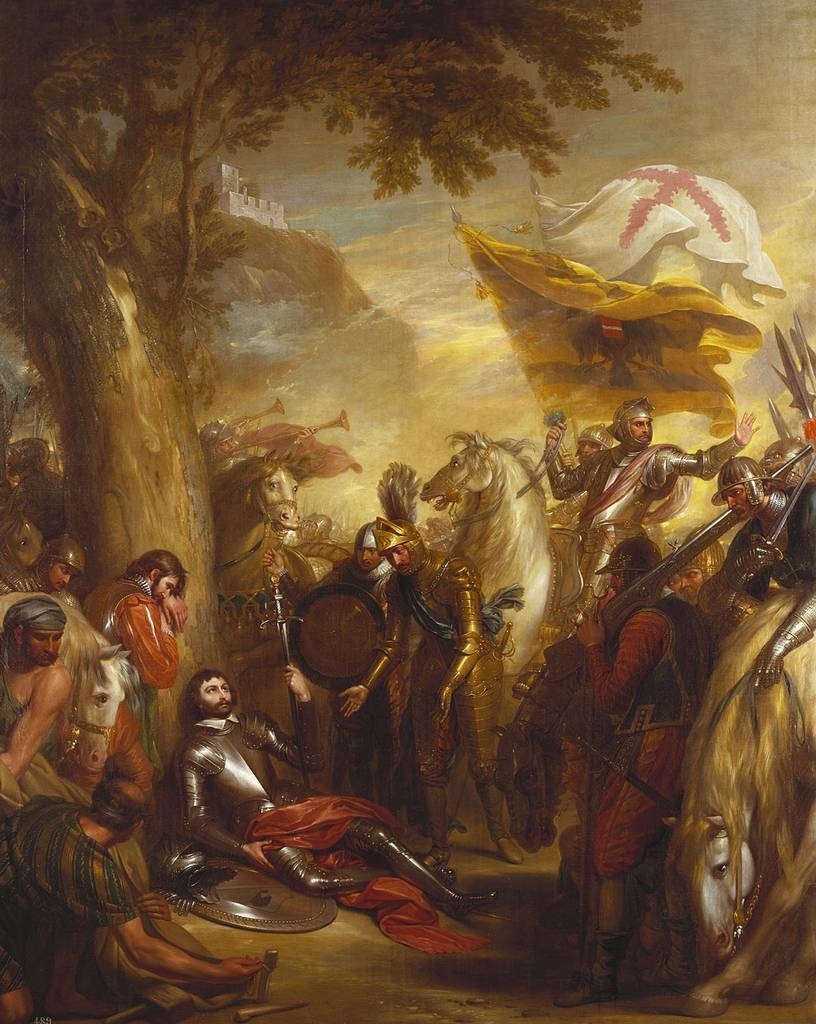
- Artist: Benjamin West
- Year: 1772
- Type: Oil on canvas, history painting
- Dimensions: 221.6 cm × 179.1 cm (87.2 in × 70.5 in)
- Location: Royal Collection, London

The Death of Chevalier Bayard is a 1772 history painting by the Anglo-American artist Benjamin West. It depicts the death of Pierre Terrail, seigneur de Bayard at the Battle of the Sesia in Italy in 1524. Fatally wounded he had urged his retreating French soldiers to abandon him. He is show receiving the homage of his enemies, the troops of Charles V.

It was one of a number of commissions West received from George III. Along with other neoclassical works, it was produced for a sitting room at Buckingham Palace. West received three hundred guineas for producing this and its pendant piece The Death of Epaminondas which also deals with courageous, stoic acceptance of a noble death. These vertical paintings were designed to flank his celebrated The Death of General Wolfe. The theme of a wounded, dignified but defeated commander echoed the role played by Wolfe's adversary Montcalm at the Siege of Quebec. The painting was exhibited at the Royal Academy's Summer Exhibition of 1773. Today it remains in the Royal Collection.

== Bibliography ==
- McNairn, Alan. Behold the Hero: General Wolfe and the Arts in the Eighteenth Century. McGill-Queen's Press, 1997
- Millar, Oliver. The Later Georgian Pictures in the Collection of Her Majesty the Queen. Phaidon, 1969.
