= Royal Academy Exhibition of 1773 =

1773 art exhibition in London

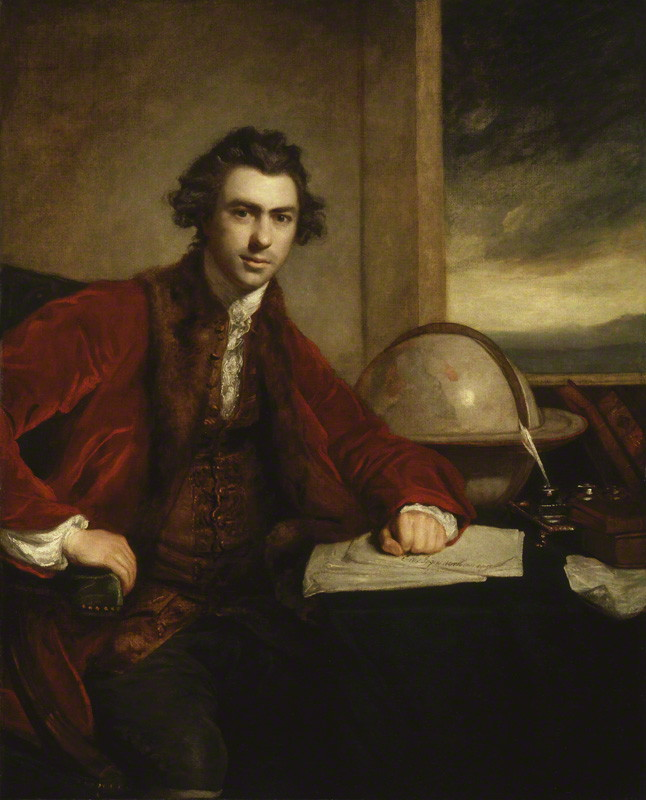
Portrait of Joseph Banks by Joshua Reynolds

The Royal Academy Exhibition of 1773 was the fifth annual Summer Exhibition of the British Royal Academy of Arts. It took place in Pall Mall in Central London between 24 April and 29 May 1773. Featuring works from 151 artists and architects, it attracted over twenty thousand visitors during its month long run.

Widely commented on was the number and quality of the thirteen paintings on show by the President of the Royal Academy Joshua Reynolds. Featuring mainly portrait paintings, including portraits of George III's brother Duke of Cumberland and his wife as well David Garrick, they also included the history painting Count Ugolino and his Children in the Dungeon, which he had been working on since 1770. In addition he displayed a fancy picture The Strawberry Girl. He produced a Portrait of Joseph Banks featuring the future President of the Royal Society.

The Anglo-American artist Benjamin West displayed his own Portrait of Joseph Banks, making reference to his recent voyage with James Cook. In addition he submitted a group of Neoclassical history paintings including The Death of Chevalier Bayard. James Barry submitted the now lost Jupiter and Juno on Mount Ida, based on Homer's Illiad. From Rome, David Allan sent in The Prodigal Son and Cupid and Psyche. Johann Zoffany exhibited a conversation piece featuring Queen Charlotte with her brothers and children.

After a dispute over one of his paintings the previous year, the Bath-based artist Thomas Gainsborough declined to submit any paintings to the exhibition despite being one of the founders of the Royal Academy.

== Gallery ==
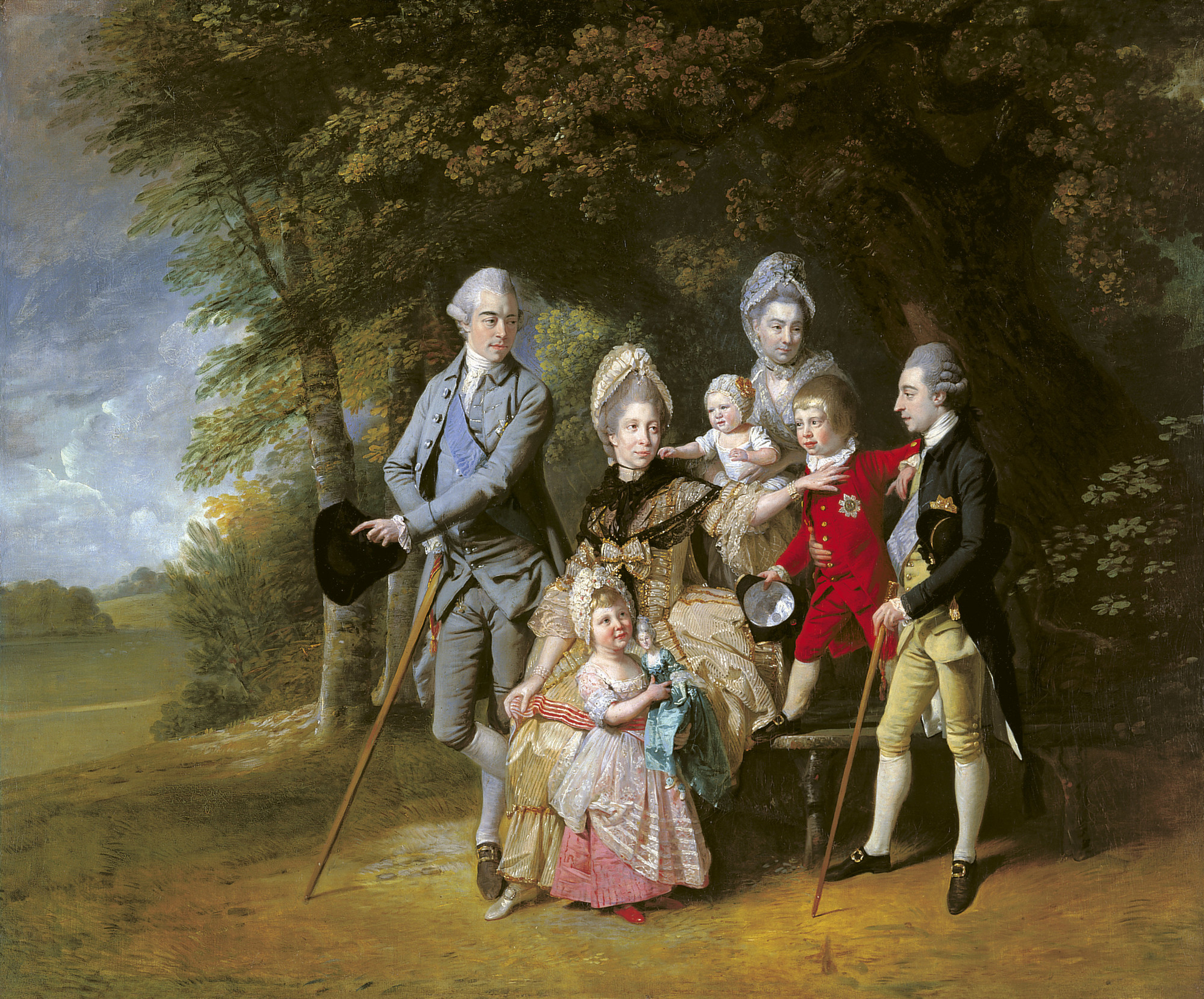
Queen Charlotte with Members of Her Family by Johann Zoffany

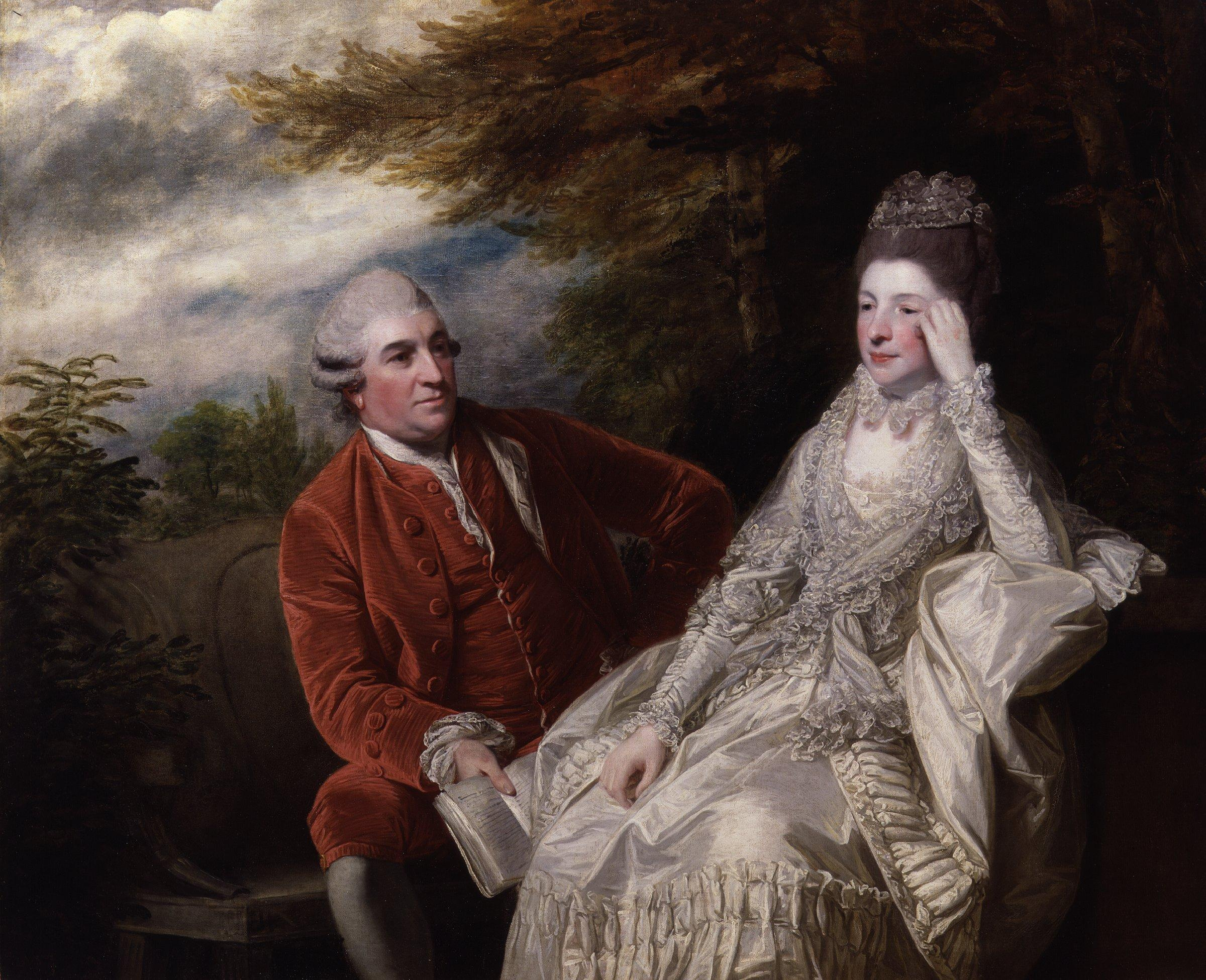
David Garrick and Eva Marie Veigel by Joshua Reynolds

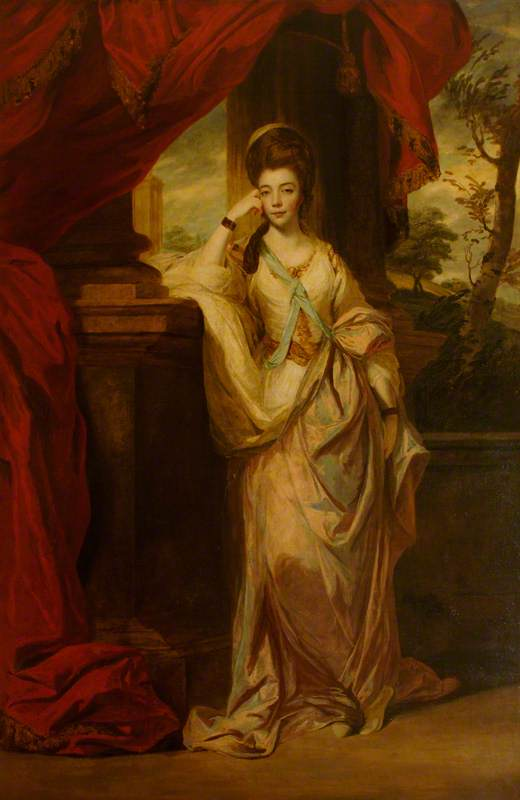
Duchess of Cumberland by Joshua Reynolds

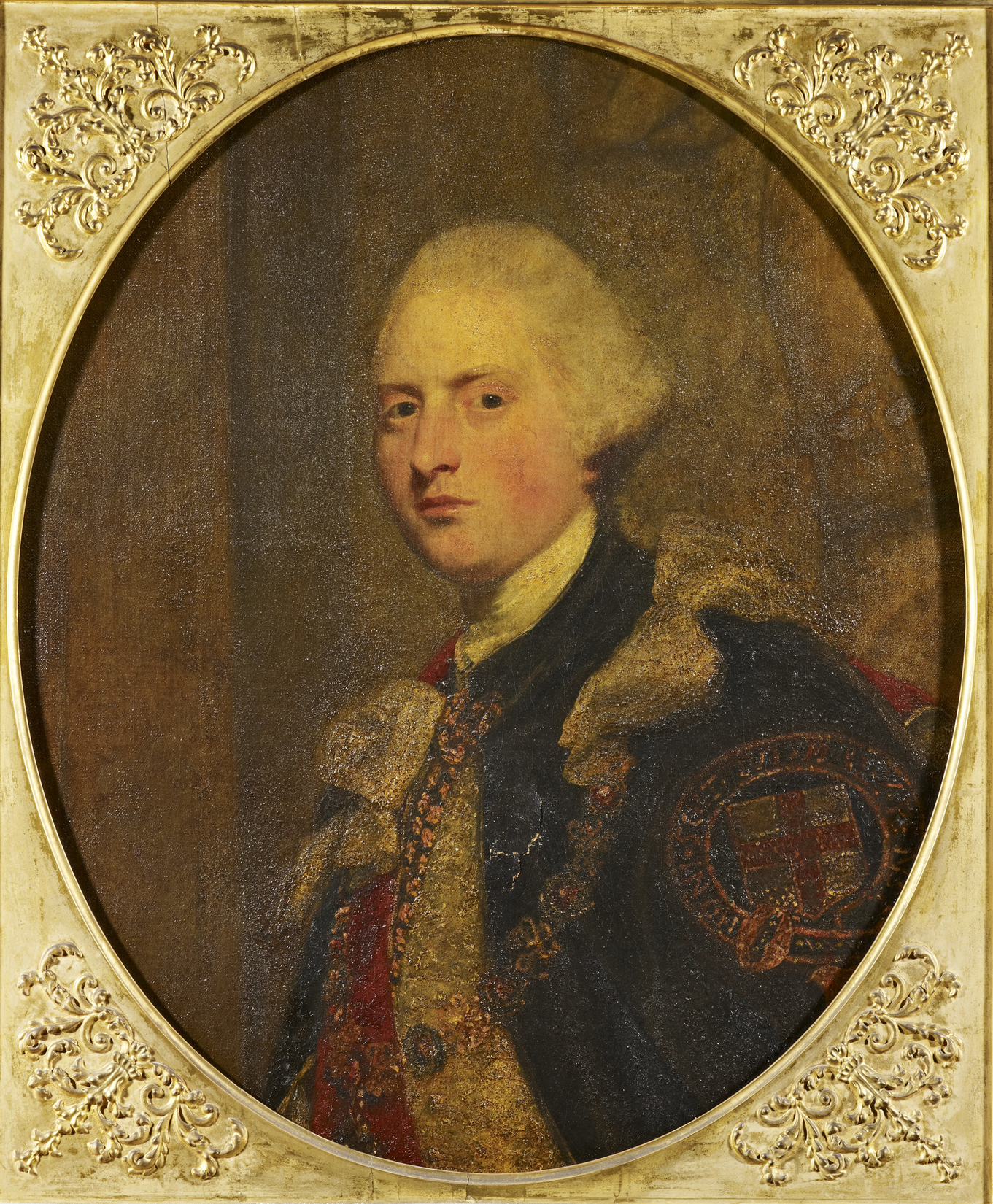
Duke of Cumberland by Joshua Reynolds

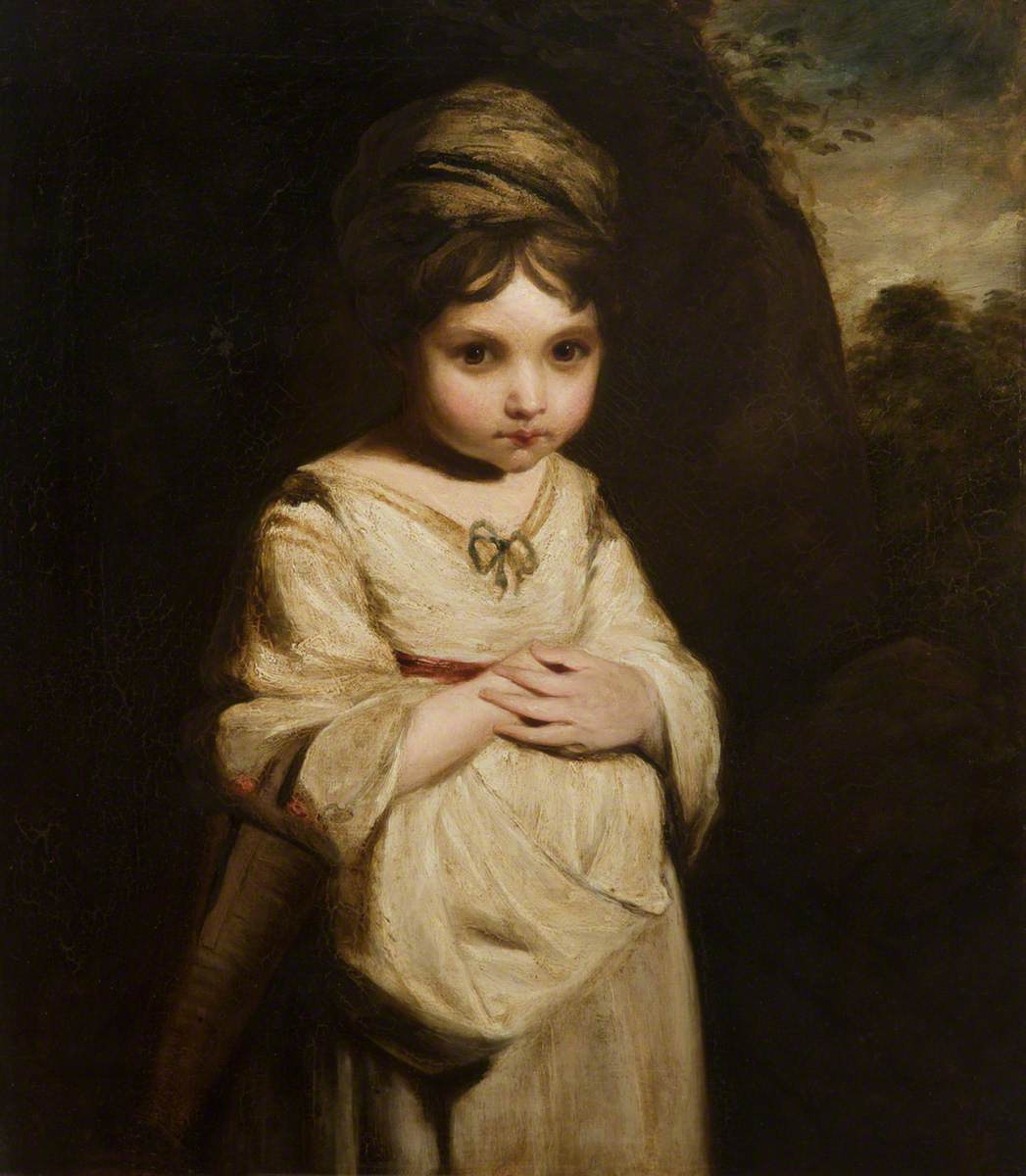
The Strawberry Girl by Joshua Reynolds

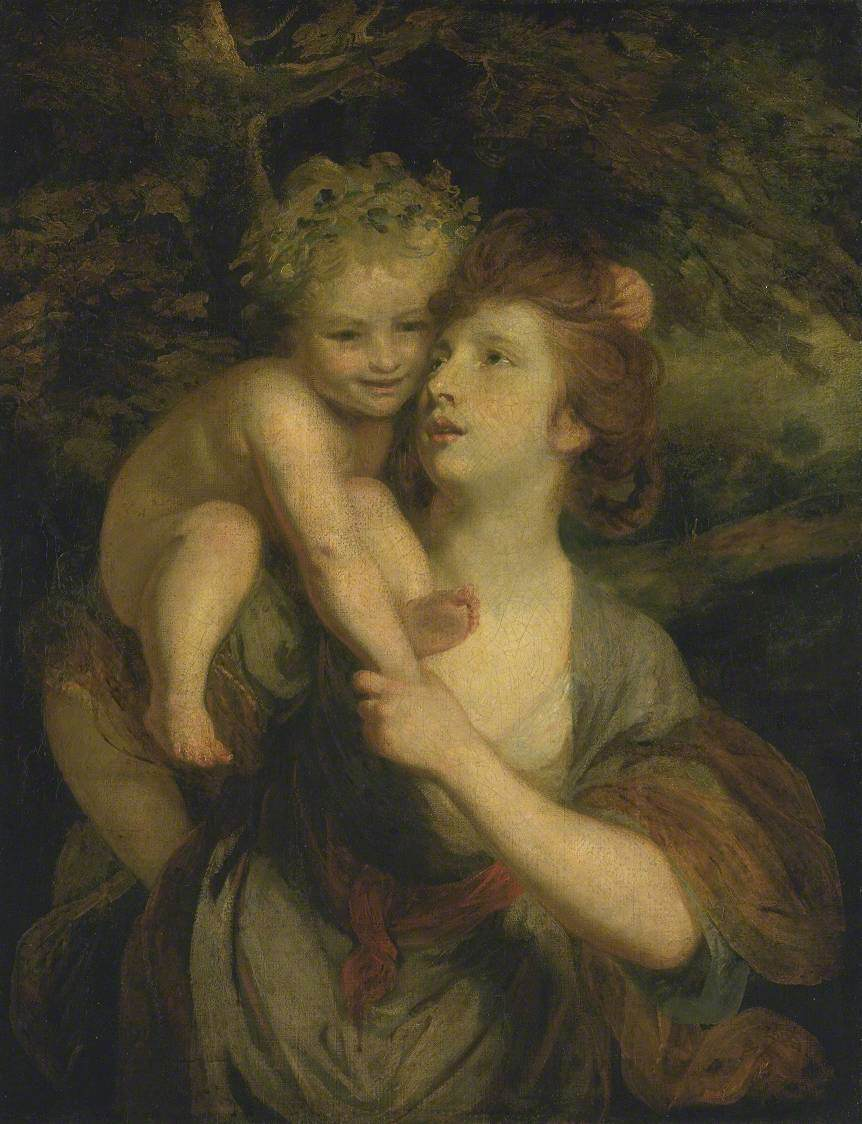
Mrs Hartley as a Nymph with a Young Bacchus by Joshua Reynolds

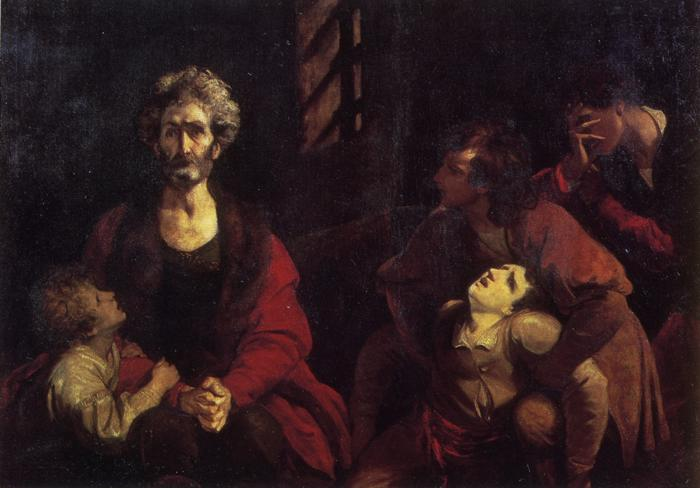
Count Ugolino and his Children in the Dungeon by Joshua Reynolds

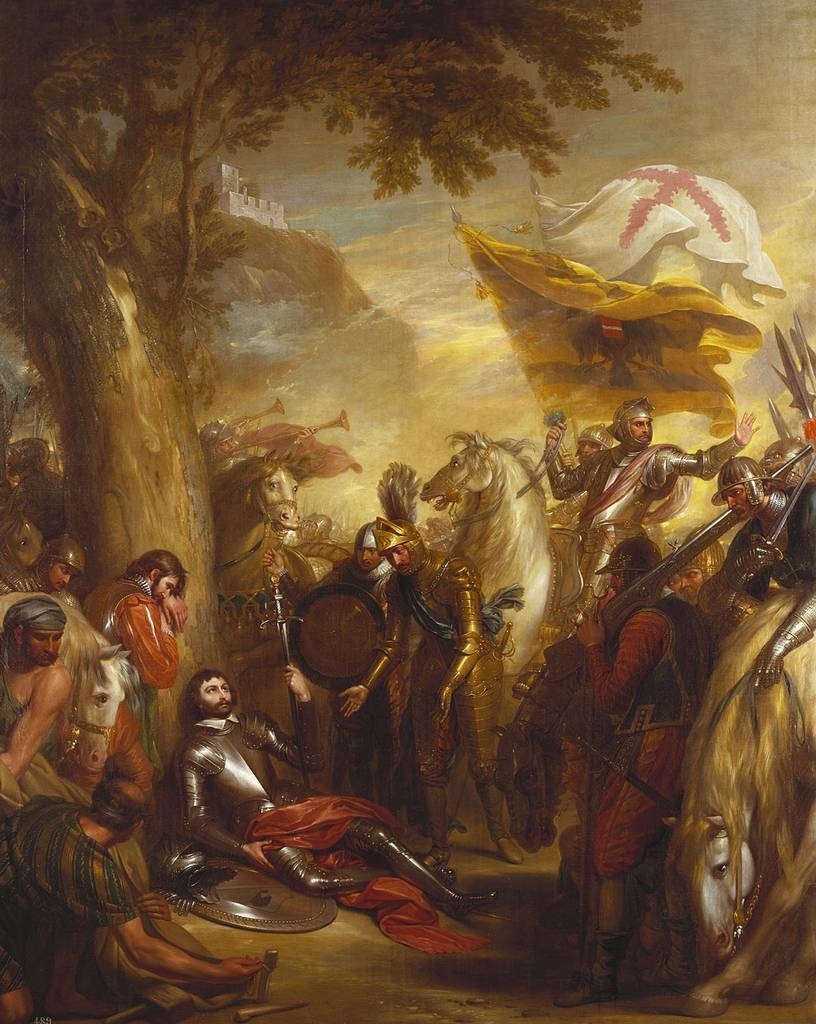
The Death of Chevalier Bayard by Benjamin West

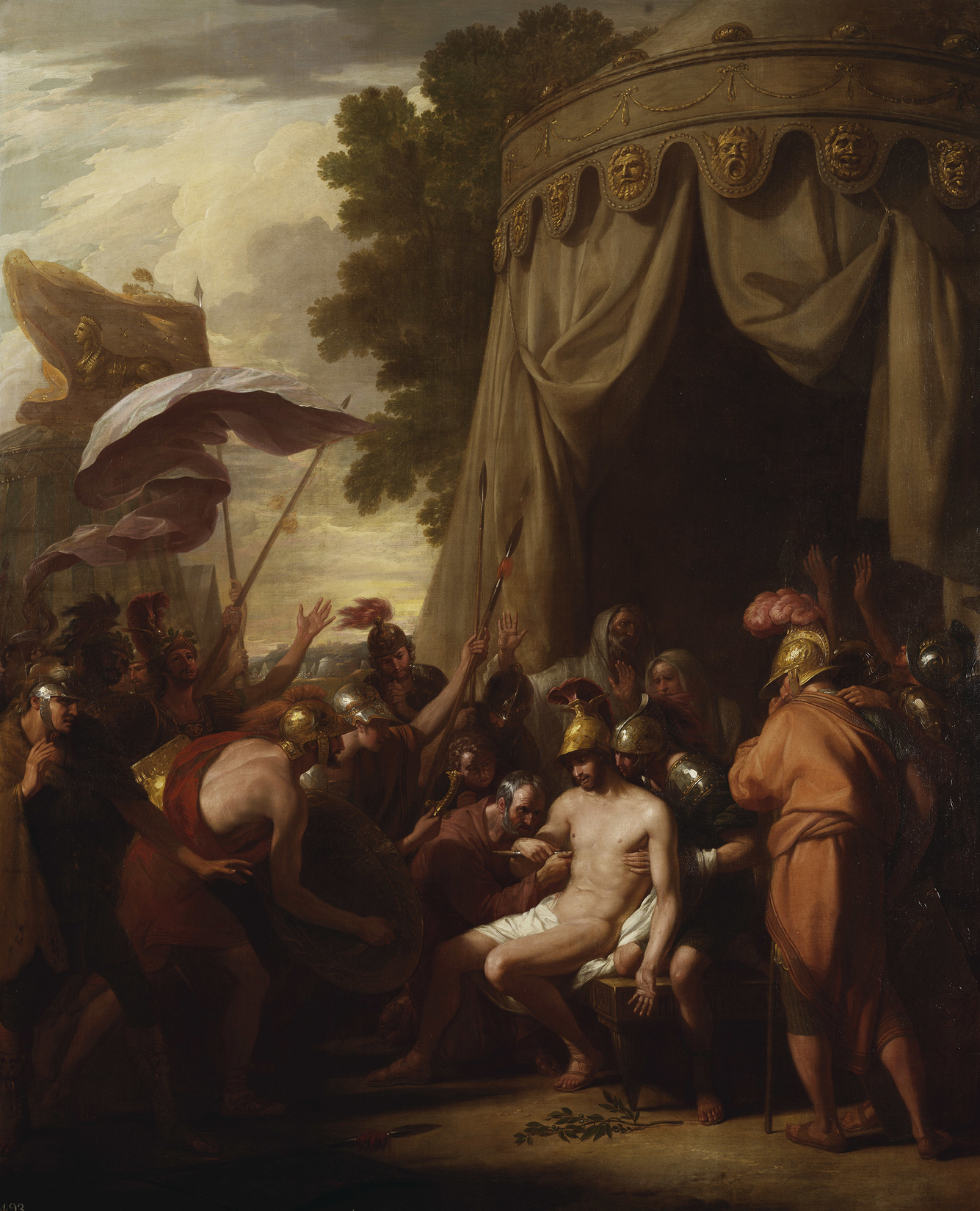
The Death of Epaminondas by Benjamin West

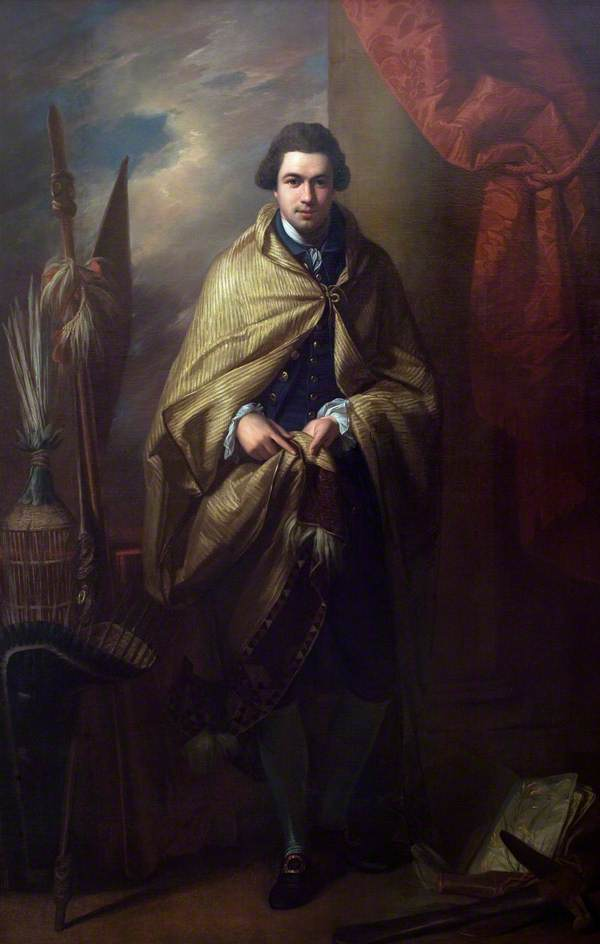
Portrait of Joseph Banks by Benjamin West

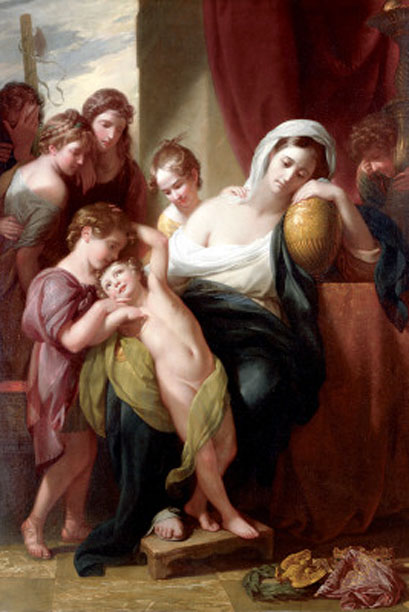
Agrippina and Her Children Mourning over the Ashes of Germanicus by Benjamin West

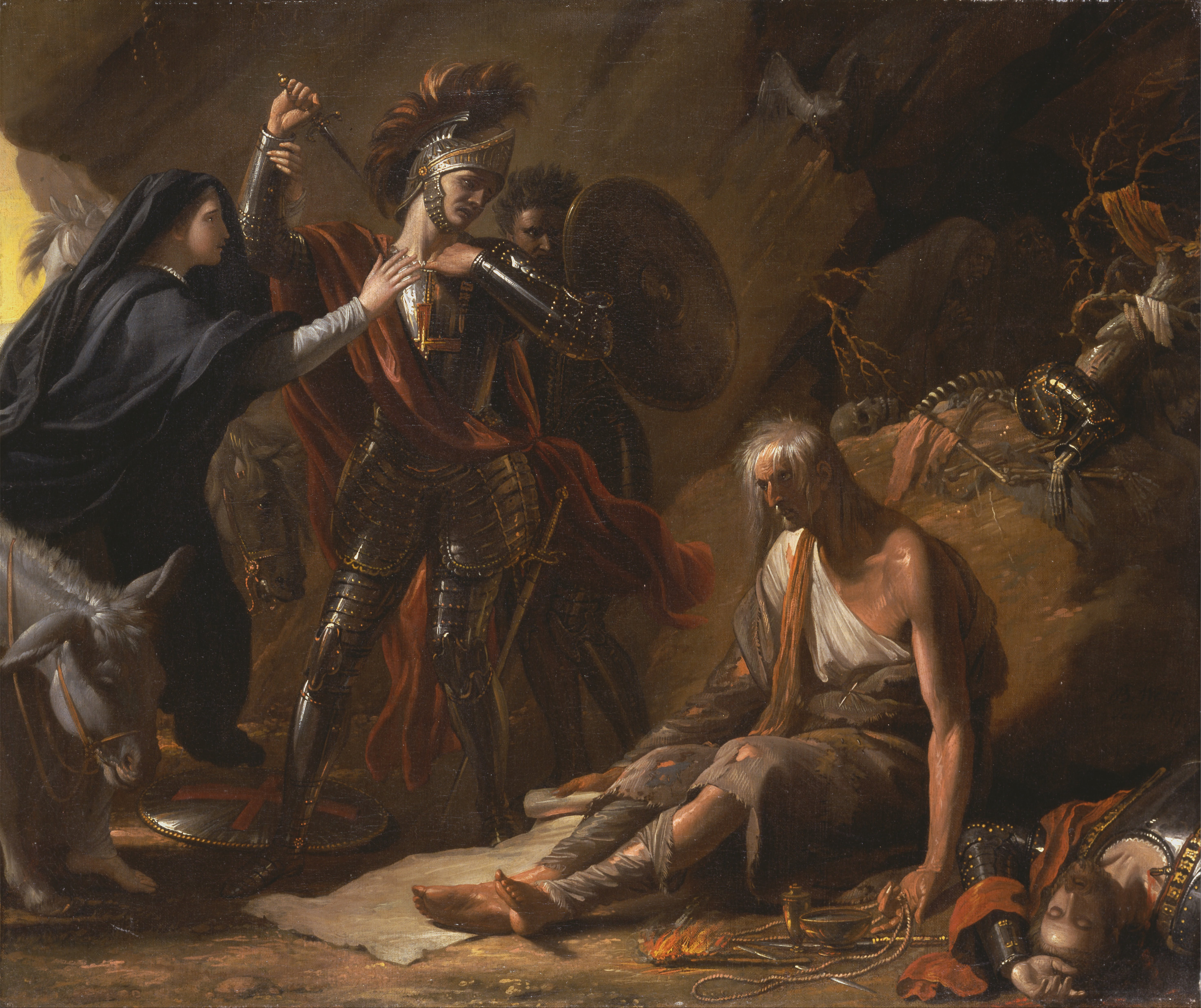
The Cave of Despair by Benjamin West

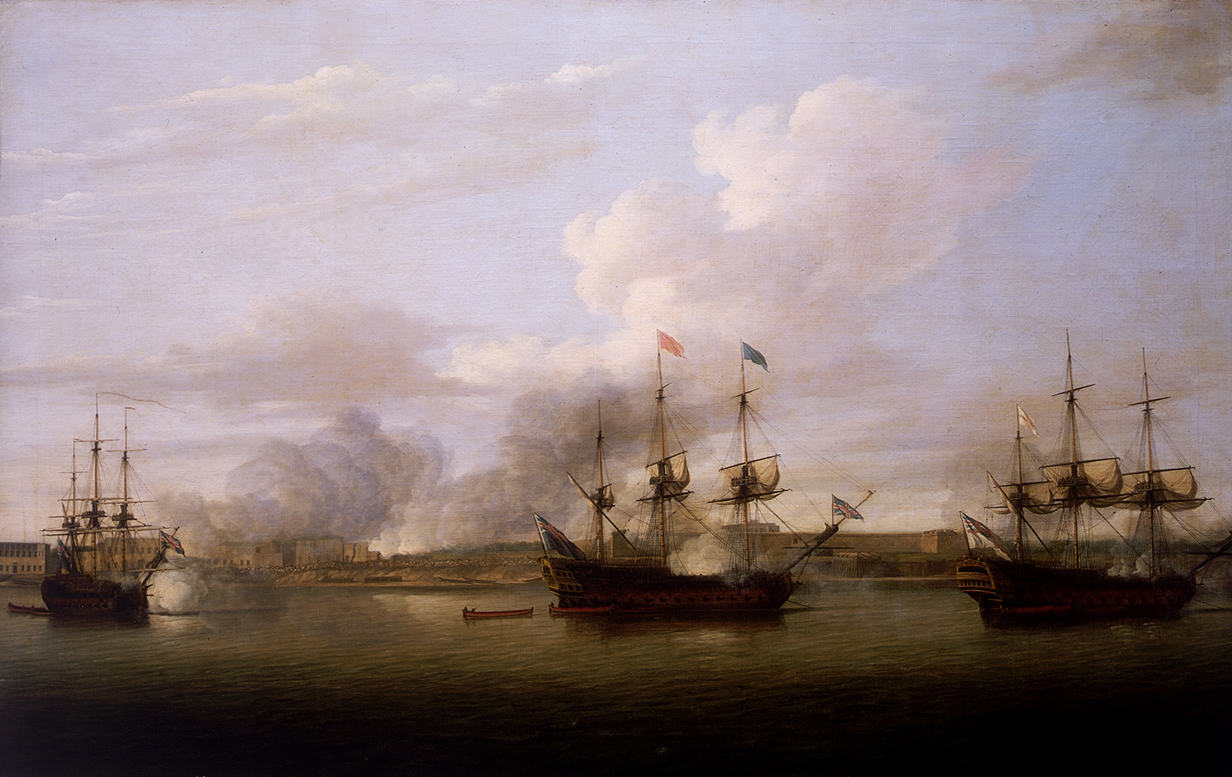
The Capture of Chandernagore by Dominic Serres

A View of Gibraltar by Dominic Serres

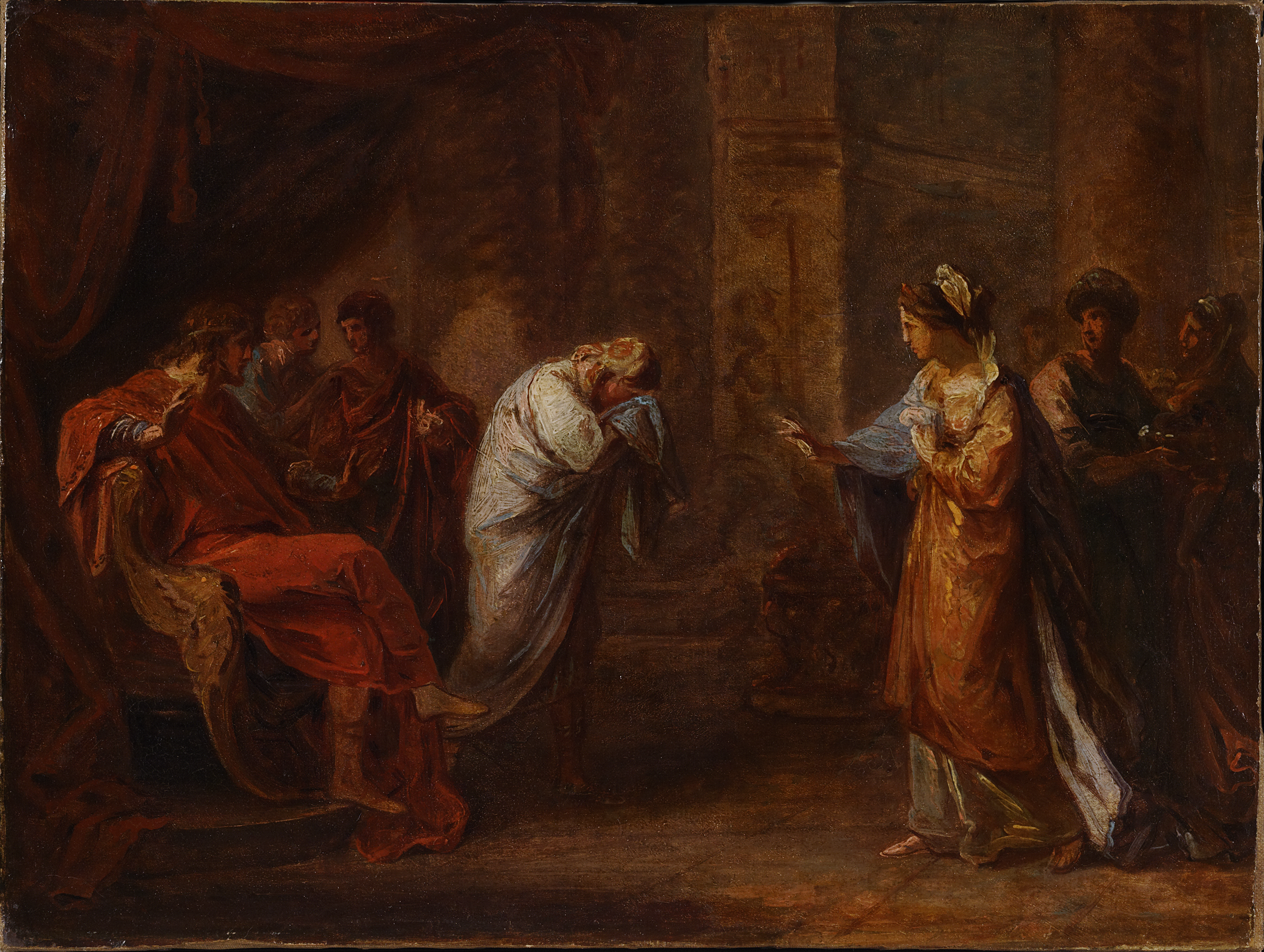
Telemachus at the Court of Sparta, preparatory oil sketch by Angelica Kauffman

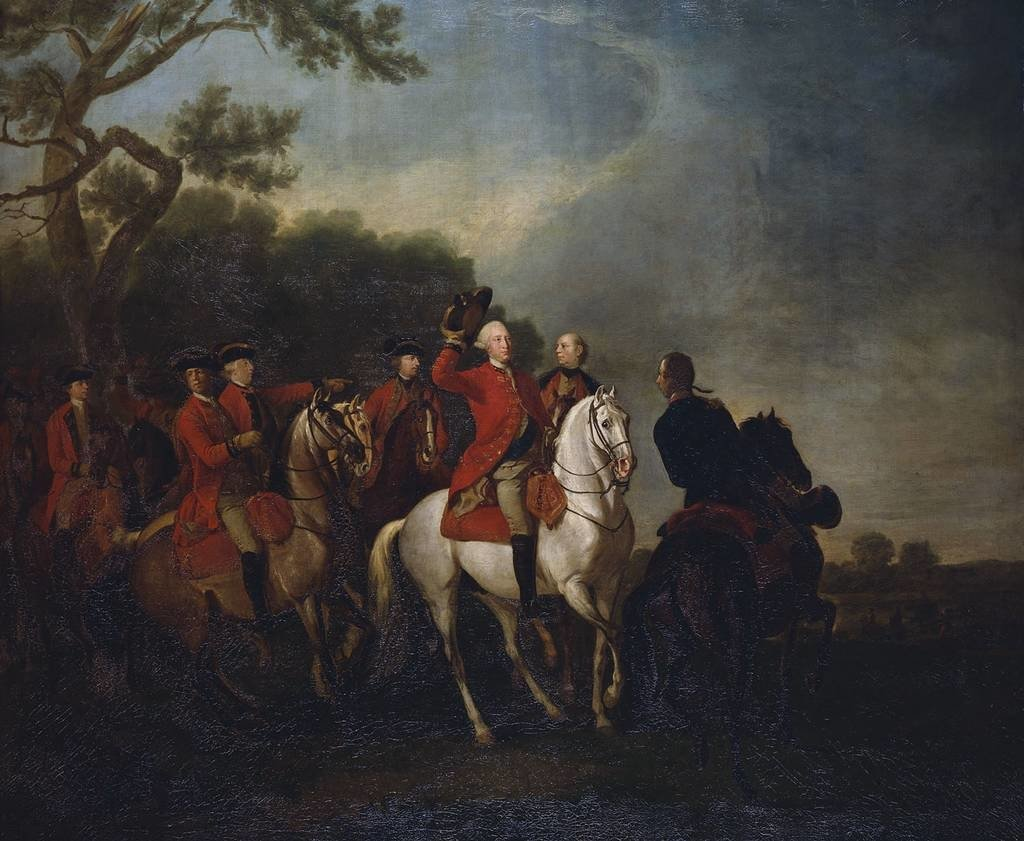
George III at a Review by Martin Ferdinand Quadal

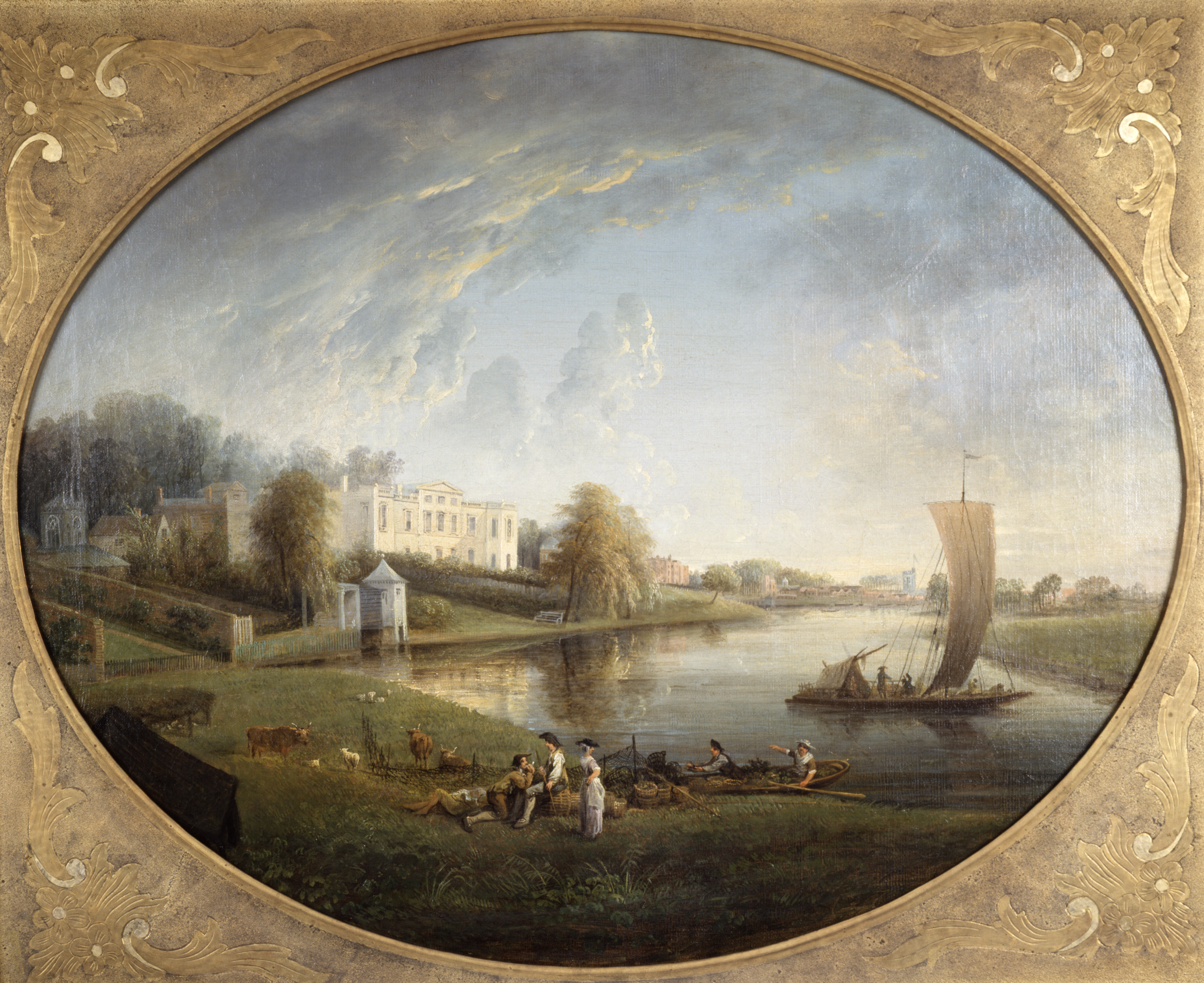
Pope's House at Twickenham by Elias Martin

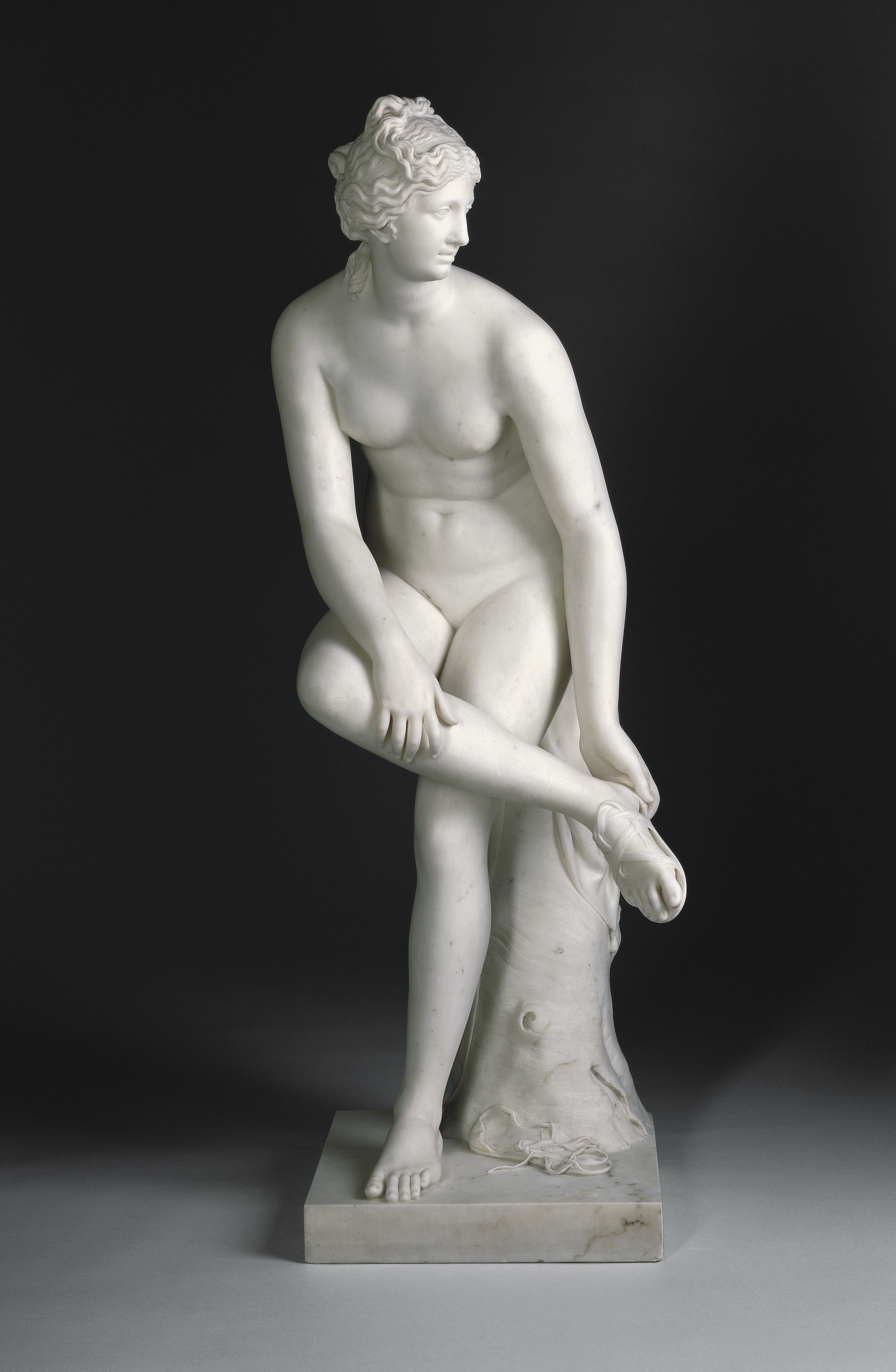
Venus by Joseph Nollekens

== See also ==
- Salon of 1773, a contemporary art exhibition held at the Louvre in Paris

== Bibliography ==
- Alexander, David S. Angelica Kauffman: A Continental Artist in Georgian England. 1992.
- Hamilton, James. Gainsborough: A Portrait. Hachette UK, 2017.
- Hargreaves, Matthew. Candidates for Fame: The Society of Artists of Great Britain, 1760-1791. Paul Mellon Centre for Studies in British Art, 2005.
- McIntyre, Ian. Joshua Reynolds: The Life and Times of the First President of the Royal Academy. Allen Lane, 2003.
