= Portrait of Joseph Banks (West) =

Painting by Benjamin West

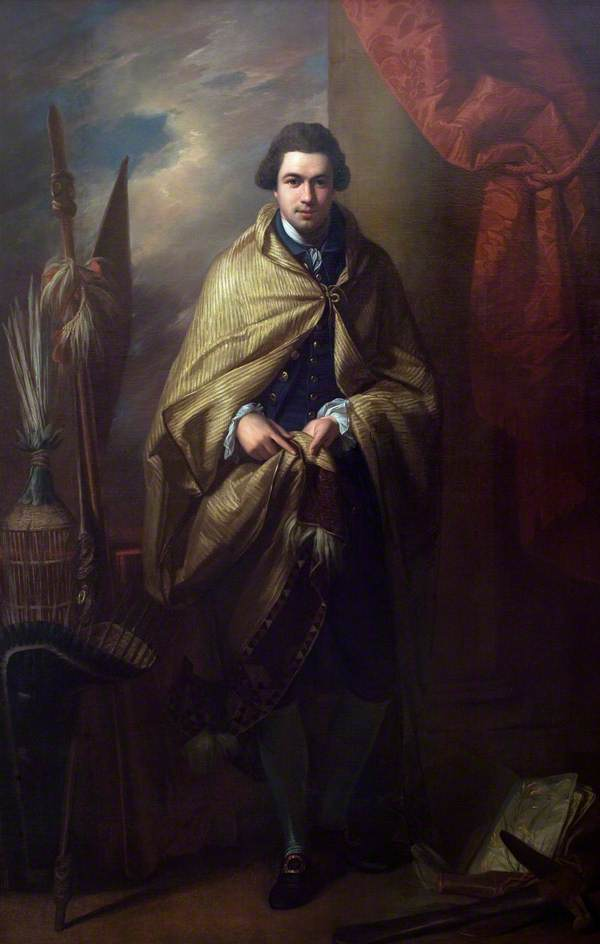
- Artist: Benjamin West
- Year: 1772
- Type: Oil on canvas, portrait painting
- Dimensions: 234 cm × 160 cm (92 in × 63 in)
- Location: Usher Gallery, Lincoln

Portrait of Joseph Banks is a 1772 portrait painting by the American-British artist Benjamin West. It depicts the English botanist Joseph Banks who has recently returned from the historic voyage with the Royal Navy explorer James Cook, which charted the Pacific Ocean. It is the first indisputable portrait of the young Banks.

West was best known for his history paintings such as The Death of General Wolfe, but was also a noted portraitist. From 1792 he served as President of the Royal Academy concurrently with Banks who was President of the Royal Society, both organisations based at Somerset House. Banks is show in heroic pose wearing a Māori flax cloak and surrounded by objects from New Zealand and Polynesia. The work was displayed at the Royal Academy Exhibition of 1773 in London. Today the painting is in the Usher Gallery in Lincoln, having been acquired for the collection in 1989.

== See also ==
- Portrait of Joseph Banks, a near contemporary painting by Joshua Reynolds

== Bibliography ==
- Coleman, Dierdre. Romantic Colonization and British Anti-Slavery. Cambridge University Press, 2005.
- Musgrave, Toby. The Multifarious Mr. Banks. Yale University Press, 2020.
