= Portrait of Joseph Banks (George Stubbs) =

Painting by George Stubbs

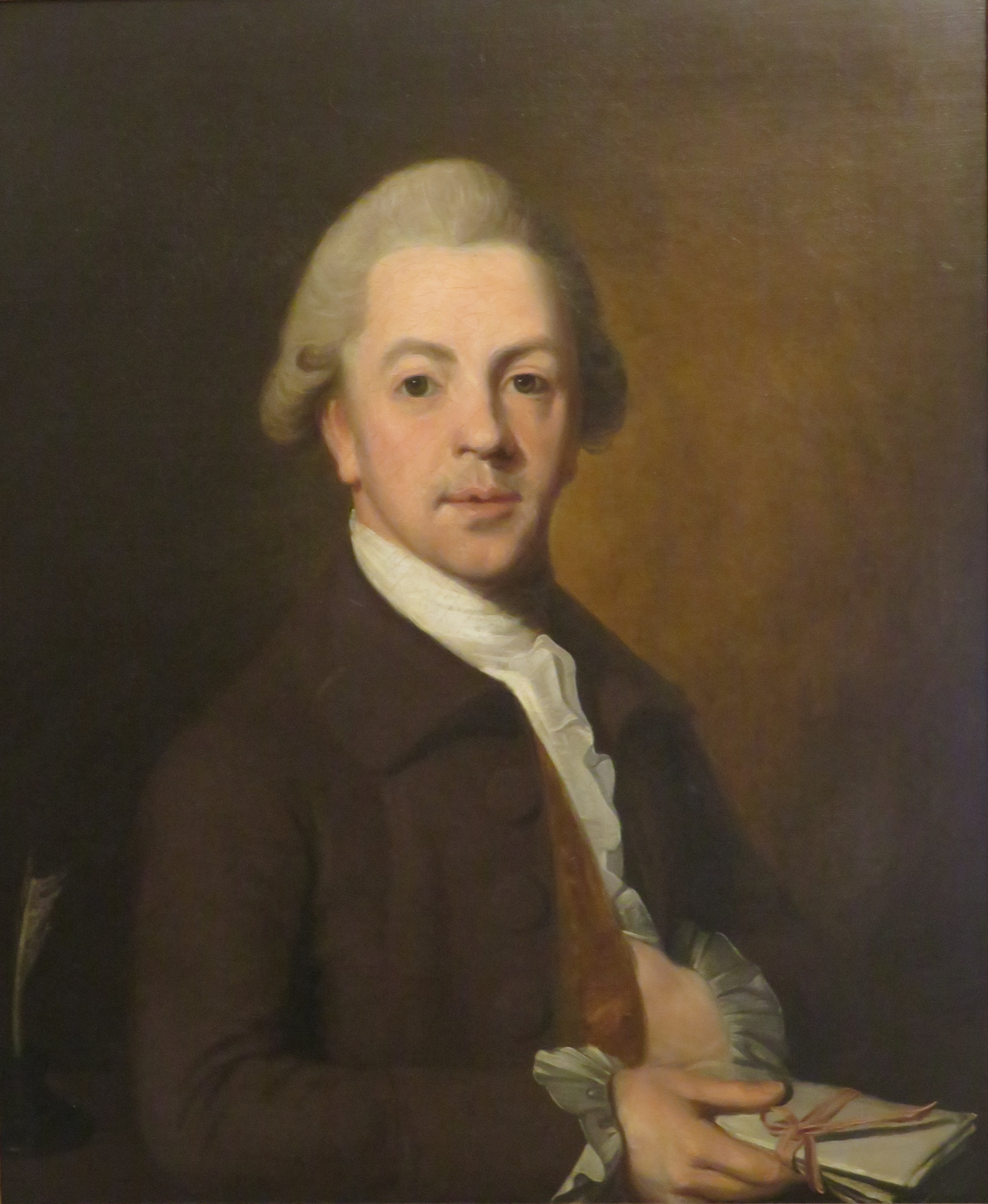
Portrait of Joseph Banks (1764) by George Stubbs

Portrait of Joseph Banks, also referred to as the Inheritance Portrait, is an oil painting by English painter George Stubbs, dated to 1764. It was discovered assembling a collection of paintings for educational exhibition in 2018. Joseph Banks' father died when he was age 18 years, but he came into his inheritance at age 21, the apparent date of the portrait. The painting was restored and reframed after Banks' voyage around the world with Captain James Cook RN.

== Description ==
Banks is holding property title deeds in legal pink ribbon. They are signed Geo S-s on one edge and filled in as TUB on the other edge, cleverly and cryptically hiding the signature as text on the parchment. Banks has a pewter ink well, with a quill pen, symbolising his intention to explore and write. He has an enlightenment smile of reason. The frame has a frieze of botanical emblems, including apparent eucalyptus and bougainvillea. In addition, a circumferential marine anchor cable pays tribute to Cook's first voyage, symbolising overcoming danger and circumnavigation. The frame dates from a restoration in the Regency period, probably in Banks' lifetime, while he was President of the Royal Society, for over forty years.

== Scientific investigation ==
Electron microscopy and atomic scatter concluded that Stubbs used Black Ivory and Burnt Sienna in a 9 to 1 mix for his dark brown background. Microscopy excluded wax globules. Gas chromatography-Mass spectrometry found only linseed oil in the varnish and paint ground. From the dates of George Stubbs' known technique changes after 1767, the science findings are very close to Banks' inheritance of 1764. X-ray revealed a unique image of the face in which Stubbs seems to have painted to teach Banks about the muscles of the face. Stubbs had taught anatomy at York Hospital for seven years and published The Anatomy of the Horse, before specialising in equestrian pictures.

== Historical context ==
The painting has been praised as a rare example of a master portrait by Stubbs of an equally important explorer, botanist and scientific figure of the Enlightenment.
