= Fernando d'Ávalos =

15/16th-century Italian condottiero

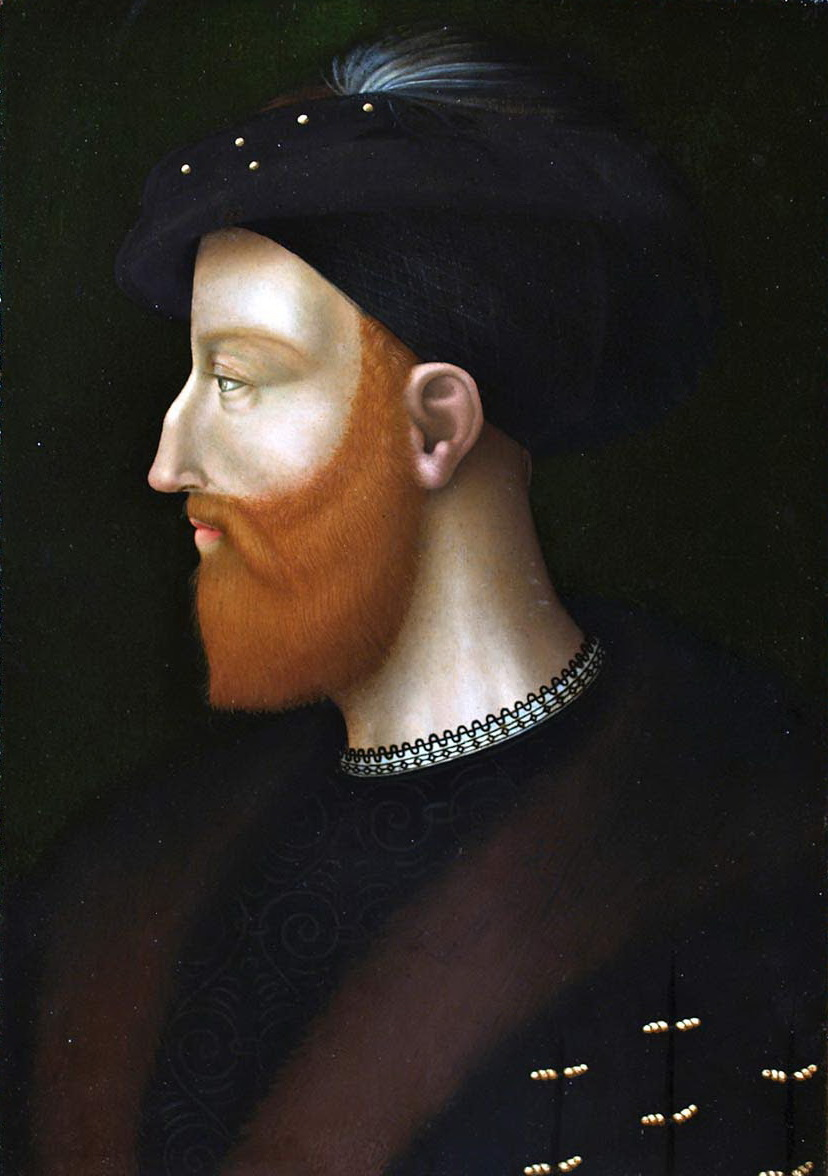
- Portrait of Fernando Francesco D'Ávalos, 1515–1520
- Born: 11 November 1489; Kingdom of Naples
- Died: 3 December 1525 (aged 36); Duchy of Milan
- Spouse: Vittoria Colonna
- Military career
- Allegiance: Kingdom of Naples; Spanish Empire; Holy Roman Empire
- Branch: Army
- Service years: 1512–1525
- Rank: General
- Conflicts: War of the League of Cambrai; Battle of Ravenna; Battle of La Motta; Italian War of 1521–1526; Battle of Vaprio d'Adda; Battle of Bicocca; Siege of Genoa; Battle of the Sesia; Siege of Marseille; Battle of Pavia

Fernando Francesco d'Ávalos d'Aquino, 5th Marquess of Pescara (in Italian Ferrante Francesco d'Ávalos), (11 November 1489 – 3 December 1525), was a military leader and nobleman born in Naples of Spanish origin. He was an important captain in the service of Spain and the Holy Roman Empire during the Italian Wars.

In the Battle of Ravenna in 1512, he was taken prisoner by the French but was released at the conclusion of the War of the League of Cambrai, after which he became a chief commander of the Habsburg armies of Charles V in Italy during the Habsburg-Valois Wars. He was instrumental to the victories over the French at Bicocca and Pavia thanks to his ordered usage of arquebusiers. He is proposed as an early innovator of volley fire in early modern warfare, setting the base for the European reforms of the 16th century.

== Biography ==
Born at Naples, Fernando was the son of Alfonso d'Ávalos d'Aquino, 4th marquis of Pescara. His paternal family, the House of Ávalos, was of Castilian origin linked to the Aragonese conquest of Naples, having arrived in southern Italy with Alfonso V's general Íñigo Dávalos, his grandfather. His mother, Diana de Cardona, belonged to the House of Cardona, a Catalan family. During his life Fernando was known as "Pescara", the city in the kingdom of Naples of which he was the Marquis. Proud of his Spanish origins and surrounded by Spaniards, he spoke Spanish at all times despite his Neapolitan extraction and arranged marriage with a noblewoman from the Papal States. According to the Renaissance historian Francesco Guicciardini, Fernando d'Ávalos considered himself more Spanish than Italian.

Farnando's father was killed during a French invasion of Naples, while the boy was still a babe in arms. At the age of six the boy was betrothed to Vittoria Colonna, daughter of the general Fabrizio Colonna, and the marriage was celebrated in 1509 on the island of Ischia. His position as a noble of the Aragonese party in Naples made it incumbent on him to support Ferdinand the Catholic in his Italian wars. In 1512, he commanded a body of light cavalry at the battle of Ravenna, where he was wounded and taken prisoner by the French. Thanks to the intervention of one of the foremost French generals, the Italian Gian Giacomo Trivulzio, who was his connection by marriage, he was allowed to ransom himself for 6,000 ducats.

He commanded the Spanish infantry at the Battle of La Motta, or Vicenza, on 7 October 1513. It was on this occasion that he called his men before the charge to take care to step on him before the enemy did if he fell. From the battle of Vicenza in 1513, down to the Battle of Bicocca on 29 April 1522, he continued to serve in command of the Spaniards and as the colleague rather than the subordinate of Prospero Colonna. He commanded the Spanish and Italian arquebusiers in Biccoca, where he arranged them in lines under strict fire discipline and ordered them to fire and file away in succession, introducing volley fire in European warfare. The effect was fulminant, winning the battle with few casualties.

After the battle of Bicocca Charles V appointed Colonna commander-in-chief. D'Ávalos, who considered himself aggrieved, made a journey to Valladolid in Spain, where the emperor then was, to state his own claims. Charles V, with whom he had long and confidential interviews, persuaded him to submit for the time to the superiority of Colonna. But in these meetings, he gained the confidence of Charles V. His Spanish descent and sympathies marked him out as a safer commander of the imperial troops in Italy than a "full" Italian could have been. In 1524 he and Giovanni delle Bande Nere, now briefly in Imperial service, defeated the French in the battle of the Sesia by using mounted arquebusiers, in which they both excelled.

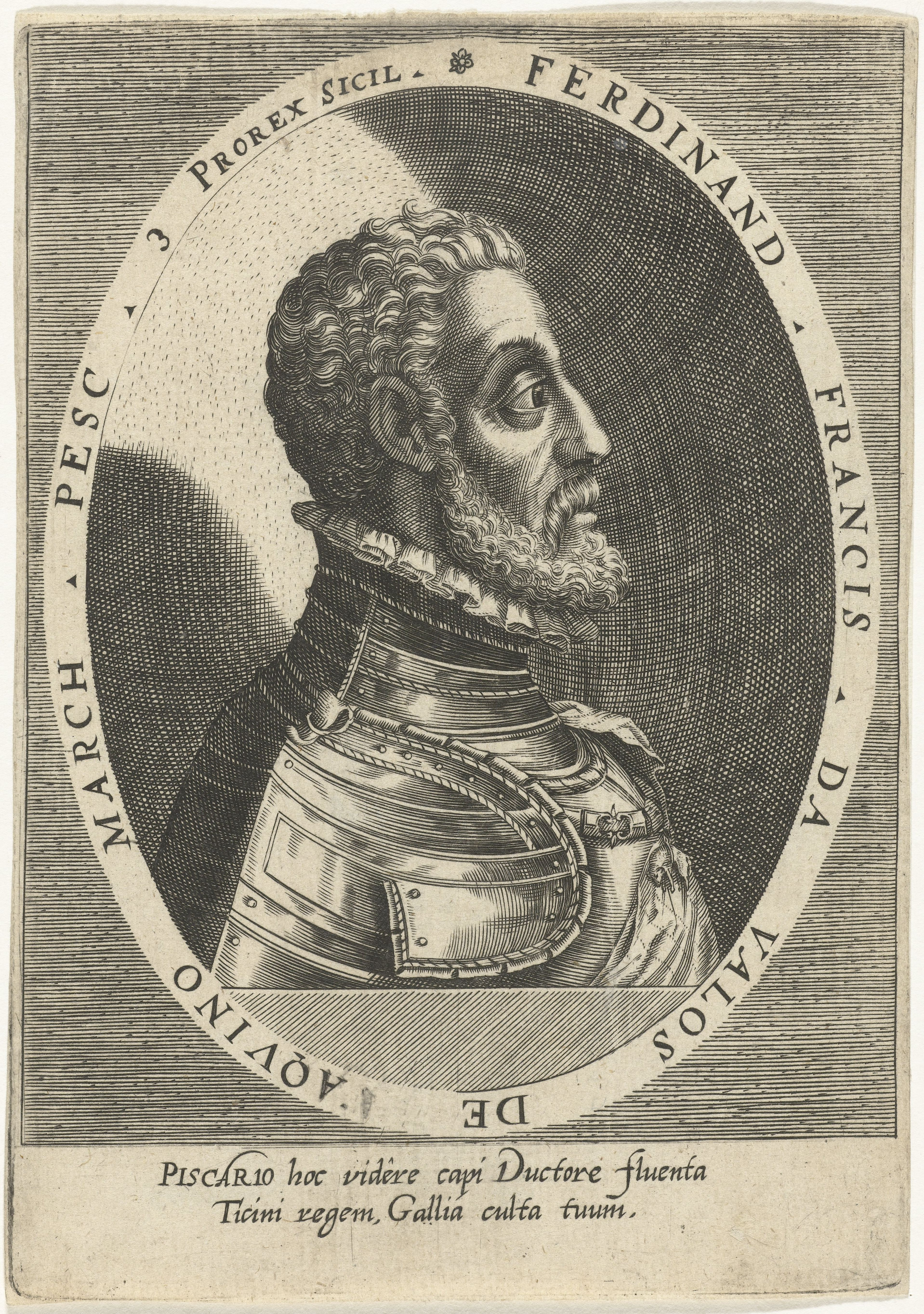
Fernando Francesco D'Ávalos

When Francis I invaded Italy in 1524 d'Ávalos was appointed as lieutenant of the emperor to repel the invasion. The difficulties of his position were very great, for there was much discontent in the army, which was very ill-paid. The tenacity, patience and tact of d'Ávalos triumphed over all obstacles. His influence over the veteran Spanish troops and the German mercenaries kept them loyal during the long siege of Pavia.

On 24 February 1525, he defeated and took prisoner Francis I by a brilliant attack in the Battle of Pavia. D'Ávalos' plan was remarkable for its audacity and for the skill he showed in destroying the superior French heavy cavalry by assailing them in the flank with a mixed force of harquebusiers and light horse. Deploying a screen of marksmen in front of his troops, he ordered them to advance keeping a continuous fire from shelter to shelter until allied pikemen could arrive to give the last push, concluding in the defeat of the French.

It was believed that he was dissatisfied with the treatment he had received from the emperor, so Girolamo Morone, secretary to Francesco II Sforza, duke of Milan, approached him with a scheme for expelling French, Spaniards and Germans alike from Italy, and for gaining a throne for himself. D'Ávalos may have listened to the tempter, but in the act he was loyal. He reported the offer to Charles V and put Morone into prison. His health, however, had begun to give way under the strain of wounds and exposure, during late November, and he died at Milan on 3 December 1525.

== Legacy ==
d'Ávalos, better known in sources as Pescara, was regarded as a pivotal figure in the history of infantry. Due to his prominent role in the victory at Bicocca, British historian John Fortescue credited him with laying the blueprint for European arquebusry for a century and a half afterwards. Fortescue suggested that Bicocca, viewed as a sequel to Cerignola, marked the first time in history that firearms were employed to their full potential. Fortescue also praised his tactical brilliance at Pavia, likening it to the impact English archers had at the Battle of Crécy. Having been originally a cavalry officer, d'Ávalos also popularized light cavalry, like his rival Giovanni delle Bande Nere. He employed it as well as pikemen to support his arquebusiers or carry them.

Along with his uncle-in-law Prospero Colonna, d'Ávalos is considered one of the two principal successors to the Great Captain, Gonzalo Fernández de Córdoba, in what has been called the "Hispano-Italian School" of military strategy. His regulations for light infantry were immediately emulated by French general Francis of Guise, though failing to produce arquebusiers as efficient as the Spanish. However, according to Sherer, d'Ávalos's role in modern historiography was diminished by the influence of late Protestant sources, which instead attribute his innovations to the Dutch and Swedish armies of late 16th century.

== Issue ==
D'Ávalos married Vittoria Colonna in 1509 but had no children; his title descended to his cousin Alfonso d'Ávalos, Marques of Vasto, also a distinguished imperial general (who in fact led the Imperial musketeers at Pavia).

== In literature ==
The Italian historiographer Paolo Giovio published a contemporary biography in Latin of Fernando Francesco which was included in his Vitae (illustrium virorum). It was subsequently translated by Lodovico Domenichi and published in Florence in 1551. Giovio's biography was also translated into Spanish by Pedro de Vallés in 1553 as Historia del fortissimo y prudentissimo capitan Don Hernando de Ávalos.

The novel Die Versuchung des Pescara by Conrad Ferdinand Meyer is about him.

John Webster's The Duchess of Malfi, first performed in 1613–1614, makes numerous references to The Marquess.

== Sources ==
- Fortescue, John (2013). A History of the British Army – Vol. I (1066-1713). Wagram. ISBN 978-1908902825.
- Hickson, Sally Anne (2016). Women, Art and Architectural Patronage in Renaissance Mantua: Matrons, Mystics and Monasteries. Routledge. ISBN 9781134777372.
- Martínez Laínez, Fernando; Sánchez de Toca, José María (2021). El Gran Capitán. EDAF. ISBN 9788441441224.
- Sherer, Idan (2017). Warriors for a Living: The Experience of the Spanish Infantry During the Italian Wars, 1494-1559. Brill. ISBN 978-9004337725.
- Taylor, Frederick Lewis (1973). The Art of War in Italy, 1494-1529. Greenwood Press. ISBN 0-8371-5025-6.
