= Guillaume Gouffier, seigneur de Bonnivet =

French soldier (c. 1488–1525)

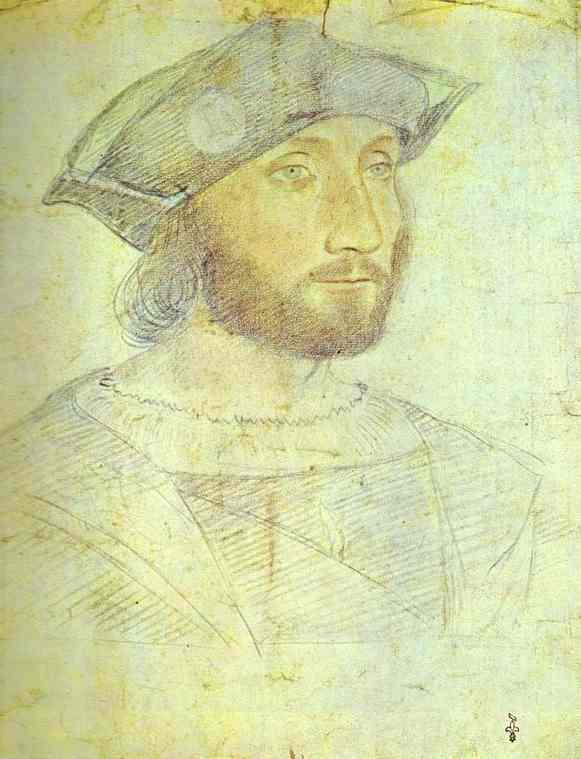
Guillaume Gouffier, seigneur de Bonnivet, in a drawing by Jean Clouet (c. 1516). Bonnivet commanded a number of French armies during the Italian War of 1521.

Guillaume Gouffier, seigneur de Bonnivet (c. 1488 – 24 February 1525) was a French soldier.

The younger brother of Artus Gouffier, seigneur de Boisy, tutor of Francis I of France, Bonnivet was brought up with Francis, and after the young king's accession he became one of the most powerful of the royal favourites. On 31 December 1517 he was made Admiral of France, in charge of all maritime affairs from which he received substantial revenues, including portions of the gains from wrecks and prizes. In the imperial election of 1519 he superintended the candidature of Francis, and spent vast sums of money in his efforts to secure votes, but without success. An implacable enemy of the Constable de Bourbon, he contributed to the downfall of the latter. In command of the army of Navarre in 1521, he occupied Fuenterrabia and was probably responsible for the renewal of hostilities resulting from its not being restored.

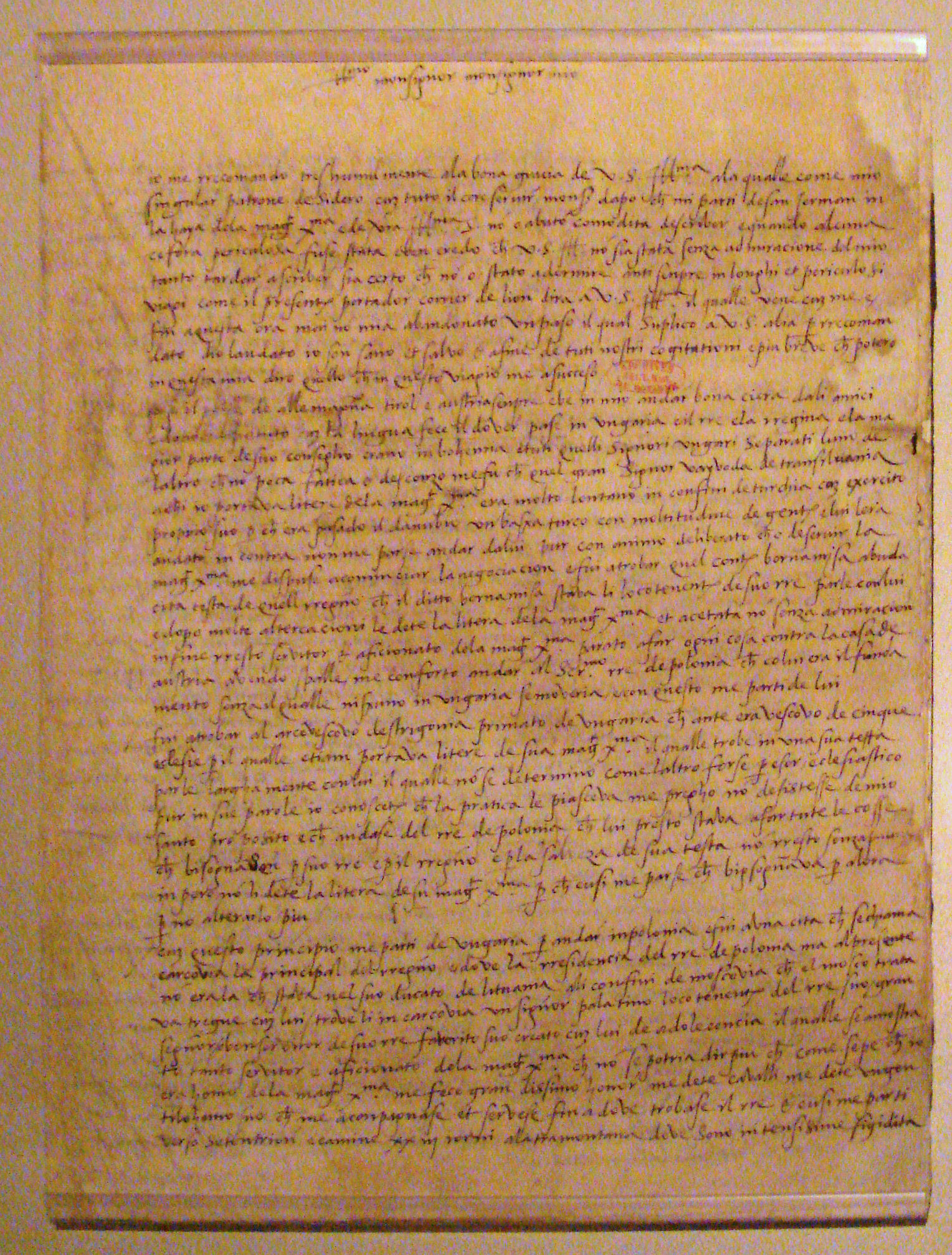
Letter of Antonio Rincon to Admiral de Bonnivet, reporting on his missions in Hungary and Poland, 4 Avril 1523.

Bonnivet succeeded Odet de Foix, Vicomte de Lautrec, in 1523, as commander of the army of Italy and entered the Milanese, but was defeated and forced to effect a disastrous retreat, in which the chevalier Bayard perished. He was afterwards one of the principal commanders of the army which Francis led into Italy at the end of 1524, and died at the Battle of Pavia.

Brantôme says that the Battle of Pavia was fought at Bonnivet's instigation, and that, seeing the disaster he had caused, he deliberately sought a heroic death. In spite of his failures as a general and diplomat, his good looks and brilliant wit enabled him to retain the intimacy and confidence of his king. He followed a licentious lifestyle. According to Brantôme, he was the successful rival of the king for the favours of Madame de Châteaubriant, and if, as is thought, he was the hero of the fourth story of the Heptaméron, Marguerite, future Queen of Navarre, was also courted by him.

Bonnivet's correspondence is preserved in the Bibliothèque Nationale, Paris and in The National Archives (United Kingdom); the complete works of Brantôme, vol. iii., are another primary source.
