= Siege of Marseille (1524) =

- Part of the Italian War of 1521–1526
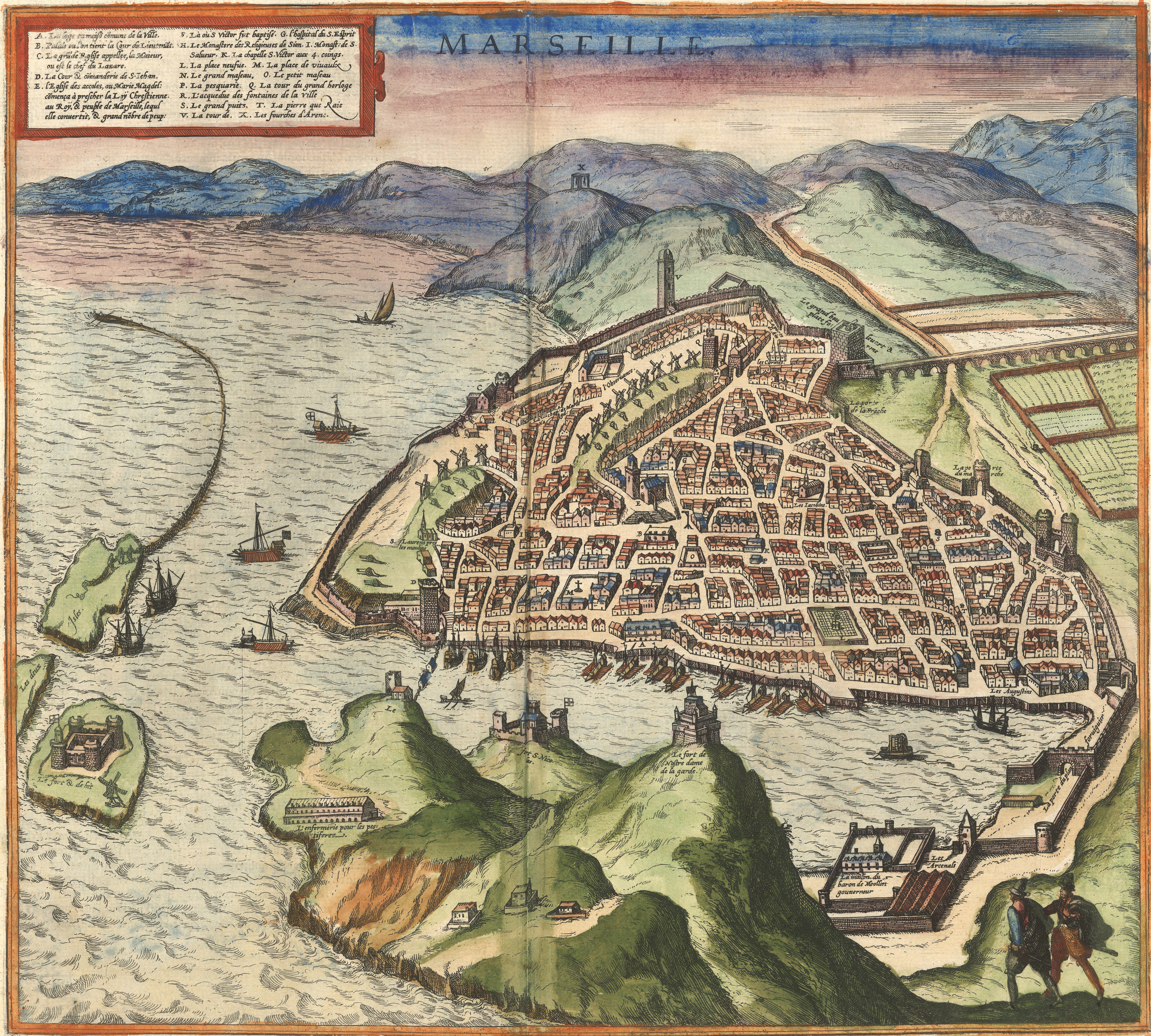
- View of Marseille around 1584.
| Date | 19 August-September 1524 |
| Location | Marseille, Kingdom of France 43°17′47″N 5°22′12″E |
| Result | French victory |

Belligerents
| Kingdom of France | Holy Roman Empire; Habsburg Spain |

Commanders and leaders
| Renzo da Ceri; Andrea Doria | (Holy Roman Empire) Charles of Bourbon (Spain) Fernando d'Ávalos |

Strength
| 8,000 men | 15,000 Germans; 4,000 Spanish; 4,000 Italians |

Casualties and losses
| light | heavy |

The Siege of Marseille (1524) was conducted in August and September 1524 as part of a larger conflict known as the Italian War of 1521–1526 by a Habsburg army, commanded by the Frenchman Charles de Bourbon and the Spaniard Fernando de Avalos.
The operation was a failure for the besiegers, who withdrew under the threat of a French relief army commanded by King Francis I in person.

== Siege ==
After the French defeat in the Battle of the Sesia on 30 April 1524, the remainder of the French forces retreated across the Alps pursued by a Habsburg army. This army was led by Charles of Bourbon, who, feeling wronged by the French King, had defected in 1523 to Charles V. Also in command was the Spanish general Fernando d'Ávalos.

The Imperial–Spanish forces sacked most of the smaller towns of Provence, and finally entered the provincial capital of Aix-en-Provence on 9 August.

Marseille was now the only city left under French control. The first Imperial troops arrived on 15 August, the siege began on 19 August, and the first assault took place on 23 August.

Since the disastrous siege of 1423, Marseille's seaward fortifications had been strengthened: the King René Tower on the port, the construction of the Château d'If, and the Notre-Dame de la Garde fort, initiated by Francis I. Before the siege, a French fleet was sent to Marseille to protect it from the sea. The siege was therefore fought around the ramparts, on the inland side. Besiegers and besieged exchanged cannon fire, while the old method of digging tunnels to undermine the walls was also employed. For a month (23 August – 24 September), the city resisted, plugging breaches in the ramparts, cutting off the tunnels dug by the Imperial forces with trenches, and repelling offensives.

The last assault attempt took place on 24 September, and after its failure, the Imperial troops withdrew on 29 September toward Italy, as a French army was approaching from Avignon to relieve Marseille.
