= Portrait of Joseph Banks (Reynolds) =

Painting by Joshua Reynolds

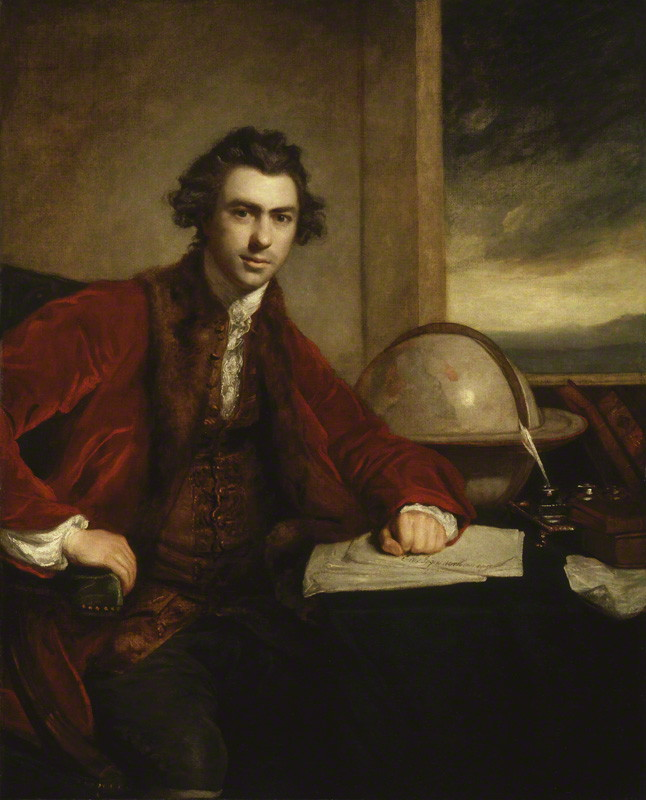
- Artist: Joshua Reynolds
- Year: 1771–1773
- Type: Oil on canvas, portrait
- Dimensions: 127 cm × 101.5 cm (50 in × 40.0 in)
- Location: National Portrait Gallery, London

Portrait of Joseph Banks is a portrait painting by the British artist Joshua Reynolds of the botanist and President of the Royal Society Joseph Banks. Banks had gained fame for his part in the explorer James Cook's First Voyage.

Reynolds was President of the Royal Academy and Britain's leading portraitist of the era. Banks sat for him several times between November 1771 and March 1773. To emphasise Banks's role in discovery (as well as the globe beside him), he is depicted holding a paper containing a Latin quote from the poet Horace translated as "Tomorrow we will sail the high seas again".

The picture was one of thirteen works that Reynolds submitted to the Royal Academy Exhibition of 1773. The painting is now in the collection of the National Portrait Gallery in London.

== Bibliography ==
- Hudson, Derek. Sir Joshua Reynolds: A Personal Study. G. Bles, 1958.
- Langford, Paul. A Polite and Commercial People: England 1727–1783. Clarendon Press, 1998.
- Postle, Edward (ed.) Joshua Reynolds: The Creation of Celebrity. Harry N. Abrams, 2005.
