= Orazio di Giampaolo Baglioni =

Italian lord and condottiero (1493–1528)

Horatio Baglioni
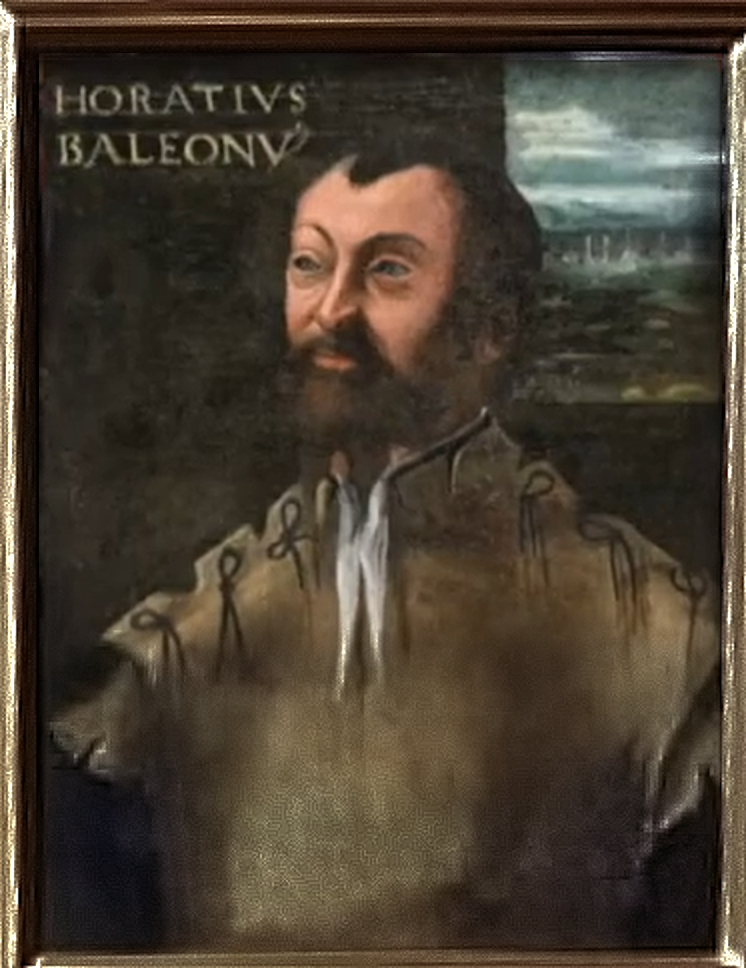
- Portrait of Horatio Baglioni. Painted circa 1600-1610, Giovio Collection

- Coat of arms
- Born: 1493; Perugia
- Died: 22 May 1528 (aged 34–35); Naples
- Cause of death: Ambush
- Noble family: Baglioni
- Occupation: Condottiero

Orazio di Giampaolo Baglioni (1493 in Perugia – 22 May 1528), also Orazio Paolo Baglioni, and anglicized as Horace Baglioni, was an Italian lord and condottiero. He took over command of Giovanni de' Medici's Black Bands after his death in 1526. Pope Clement VII held him responsible for the unrest in Perugia and imprisoned him in Castel Sant'Angelo in Rome. However, during the siege of Rome in 1527 prior to its sack, Clement put Orazio in charge of the city's defences. He died in an ambush during the Siege of Naples.

== Biography ==
Belonging to the Baglioni family, he assumed command of the Bande Nere upon the death of Giovanni delle Bande Nere in 1526. Pope Clement VII held him responsible for the turmoil that agitated Perugia, going so far as to lock him up in the Castel Sant'Angelo. In 1527, however, when Rome was besieged before the sack, he entrusted him with the defense of the city. He died during the Siege of Naples from an ambush in 1528.
