= Castello di San Michele in Teverina =

Castle in Lazio

Coordinates: 42.600435°N 12.173184°E

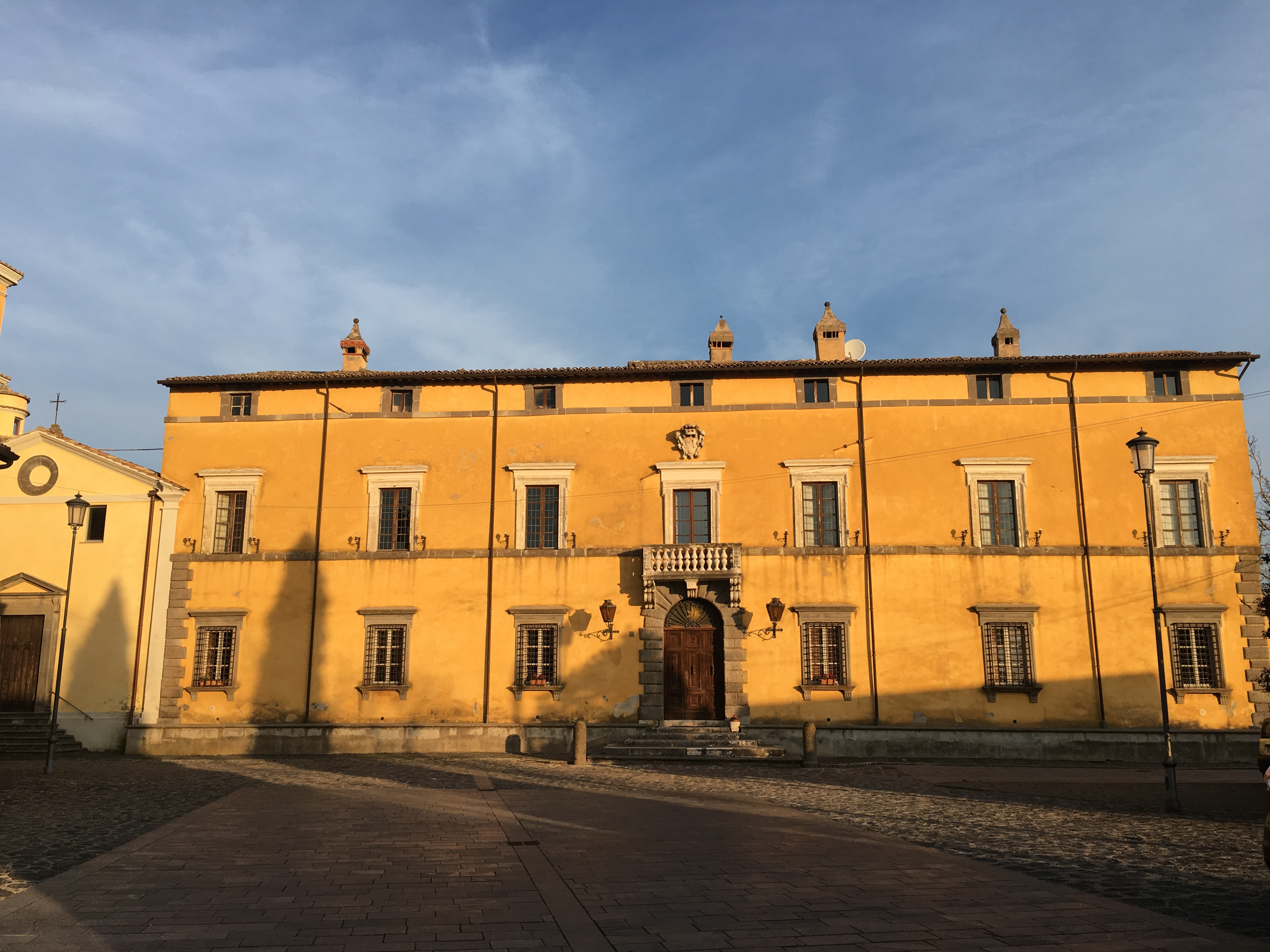
Castello di San Michele in Teverina

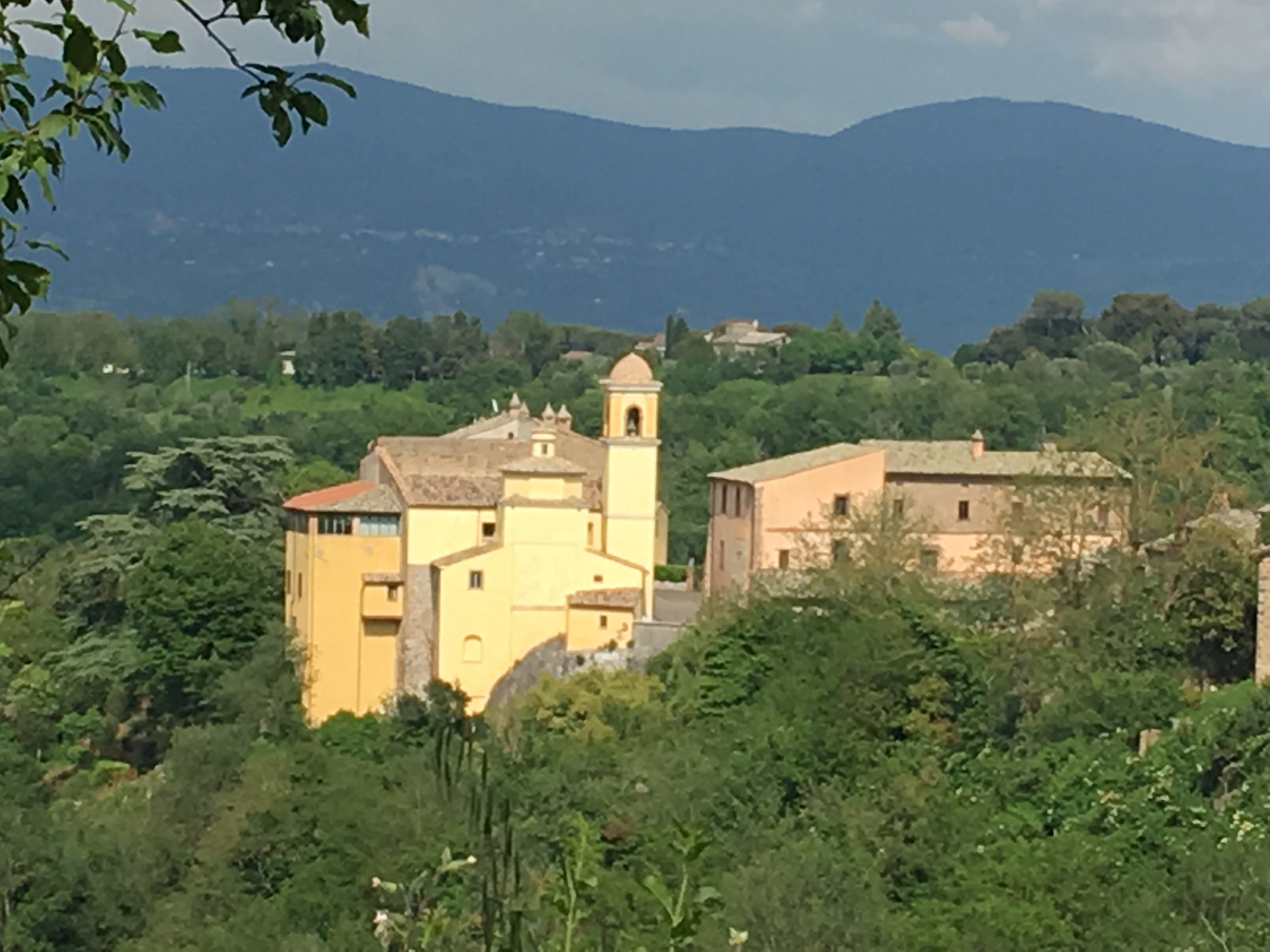
Valley view of the Castle

The Castle of San Michele (Italian: Castello di San Michele), once known as the Castel di Piero, was built in the Lazio region of Italy during the 12th century. It is located in the village of San Michele in Teverina, Civitella d'Agliano, Viterbo.

== History ==
Piero di Mugnano, lord of other fiefdoms in the Tiber Valley, built this fortress in Tuscia, Latium. For nearly five centuries it remained in the hands of the Baglioni di Castel di Piero family.

In 1522, a succession quarrel between Piero I Baglioni, who had married a Medici, and Antonio Baglioni di Perugia, who had married a Farnese, led to the siege of the castle by Galleazo Farnese. Piero resisted and 500 Corsican mercenaries were killed, but finally the castle was taken and its defensive structures were for the most part dismantled. A few years later, Piero I regained control and built the Renaissance castle over the remains of the medieval fortress. The rebuilding seems to have been overseen by Catherine de Galleto de Medici, his wife, and by their daughter Virginia Baglioni. Another daughter, Francesca Baglioni, helped raise the future Queen of France, Marie de Medici, set up the Order of the Daughters of Humility in Rome, and was beatified.

The modern remains of the castle date mainly from the epoch of Catherine de Medici. As a cousin of the Baglioni, she is said to have owned the fiefdom for some time. In the 17th century, the castle was inherited by the Domicelli di Orvieto, and then owned by other noble families. At the end of the 18th century, the fiefdom of Castel di Piero, re-baptised San Michele, belonged to Prince Benedetti del Precetto, count of San Michele.

In 1849, San Michele was purchased by the family of the Princes de Montholon, whose Parisian residence was the Hôtel de Besenval. The most famous member of that family, Charles Tristan, Marquis de Montholon, shared Napoléon's exile in Sainte-Hélène and executed his will. Charles Tristan's heirs owned the castle until 1970.

== Location ==
The Renaissance palace and the remains of the medieval castle are situated on a wooded promontory at the very end of the village of San Michele in Teverina, centered around a square which used to be the castle courtyard. The valley surrounding the castle was included by UNESCO in its tentative list of World Heritage sites in 2017.
