= Siege of Naples (1528) =

1528 siege of Naple during the War of the League of Cognac

- Part of the War of the League of Cognac
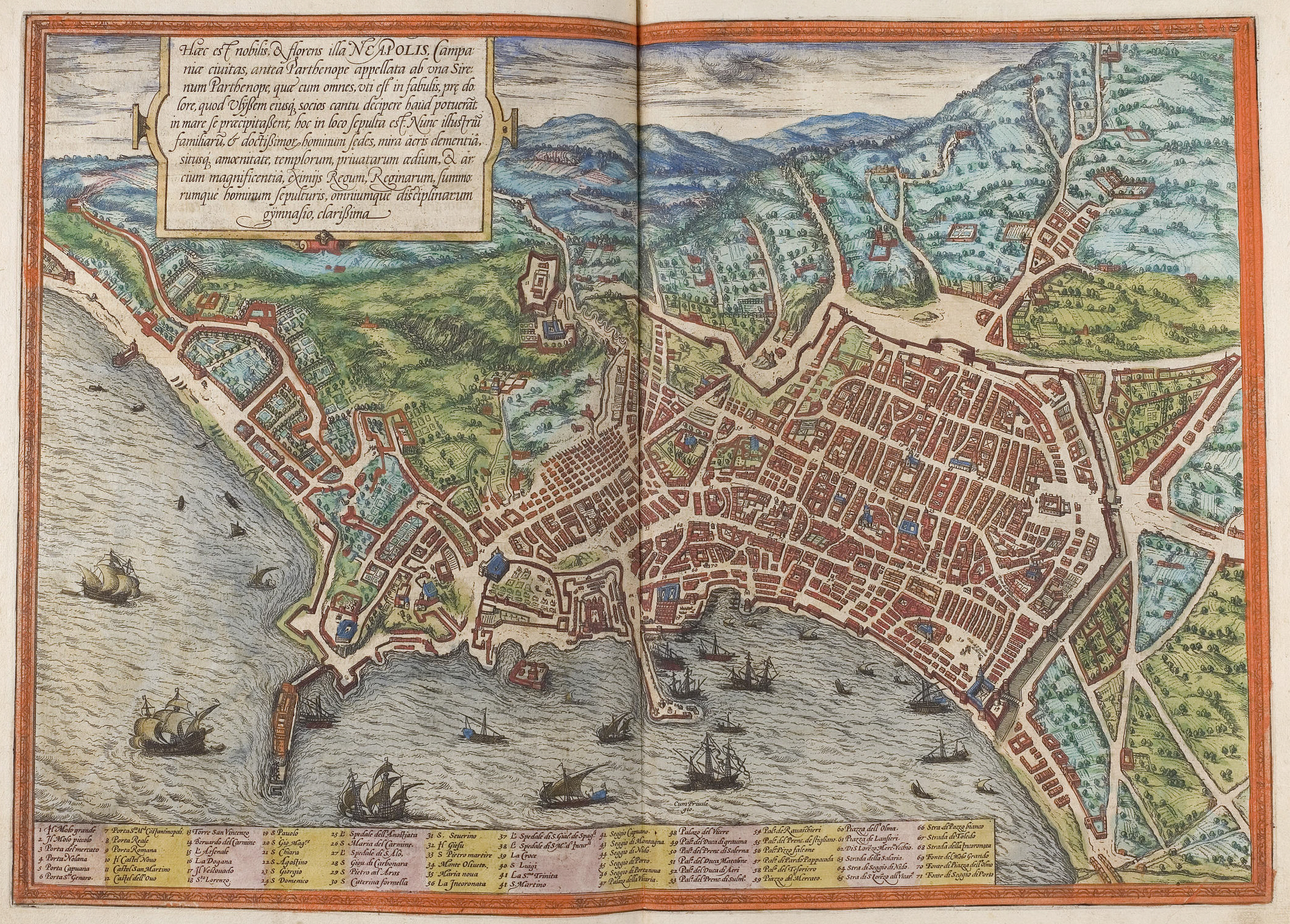
- 1572 map of Naples
| Date | April 1528 - August 1528 |
| Location | Naples 40°50′00″N 14°15′00″E |
| Result | Habsburg victory |

Belligerents
| Kingdom of France; Kingdom of Navarre; Papal States; Republic of Venice; Marquisate of Saluzzo; Republic of Genoa (until 4 July) | Holy Roman Empire; Habsburg Spain; Republic of Genoa (after 4 July) |

Commanders and leaders
| Odet de Foix †; Louis of Lorraine †; Giampaolo Baglioni †; Pietro Navarro †; Charles of Navarre; Michele Antonio di Saluzzo; Filippino Doria (before 4 July); Pietro Lando | Hugo of Moncada †; Philibert de Chalon; Ferrante I Gonzaga; Alfonso III d'Avalos; Filippino Doria (after 4 July) |

Strength
| 3,000 in the Black Bands; 6,000 French soldiers | Unknown |

The siege of Naples was a siege of the Italian city of Naples in 1528 during the War of the League of Cognac.

== Course ==
In April 1528, the French commander Odet de Foix laid siege to the city while Andrea Doria's nephew Filippino organised a naval blockade. The site of the French camp is now occupied by the Cemetery of the 366 Fossae. The hill on which it stood is now known as Poggioreale, but was once called monte di Leutrecco or Lo Trecco, using de Foix's Italian nickname. It was also later mangled into 'Trivice', which was then incorrectly transliterated into Italian as 'Tredici'.

Towards the end of April, Naples' governor Hugo of Moncada was killed by two arquebusiers and thrown into the sea during an unsuccessful attempt to break through the naval blockade and reach the Gulf of Salerno. During the battle Alfonso III d'Avalos was captured - he played a decisive part in the later negotiations for Doria's defection. Charles V, Holy Roman Emperor appointed Philibert of Chalon Moncada's replacement as governor.

On 22 May, Orazio di Giampaolo Baglioni and his Black Bands were ambushed by a squad of Landsknechts near the river Sebeto, with Baglioni killed by a pike thrust. Colonel Frangipane found his platoon surrounded by hellion briganti and surrendered the garrison on 2 June. On 4 July, Doria lifted the naval blockade after Genoa switched allegiance to the Holy Roman Empire in exchange for the liberation and subjugation of Savoy. In summer 1528, de Foix destroyed the Bolla Aqueduct to try to starve out Naples' garrison. However, this turned the surrounding areas into marshes which combined with the summer heat to cause a fatal epidemic among the French forces. Many died, including de Foix himself on 15 August, passing command of the French force to Louis, Count of Vaudémont, who also died of illness a few days later, passing the command this time to marquis Michele Antonio di Saluzzo.

The French gave up the siege at the end of August and tried to withdraw to Aversa, but were intercepted by an Imperial force, which captured Charles of Navarre and the famous military engineer Pietro Navarro. Navarro was imprisoned in Castel Nuovo, where he was strangled or hanged later that month.
