= Giuseppe Enzo Baglioni =

Italian engraver, painter and engineer (1884 - 1945)

Enzo Baglioni
- Giuseppe Enzo Baglioni
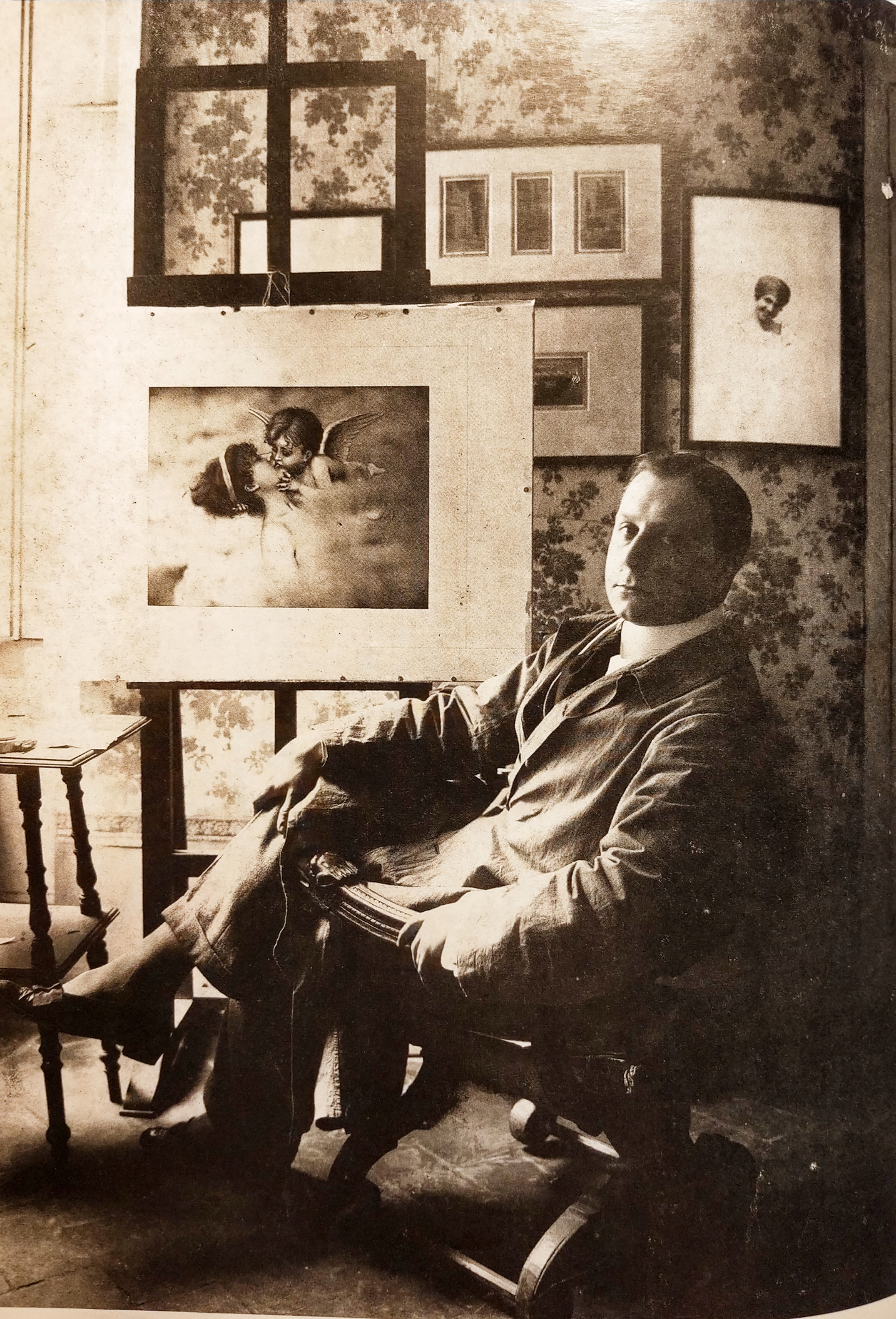
- Born: July 25, 1884; Ferrara, Province of Ferrara, Kingdom of Italy
- Died: May 12, 1945 (aged 60); San Nicolò, Kingdom of Italy
- Cause of death: Shooting
- Body discovered: Cimitero di Rero
- Other name: Poet of the Bulino (unofficial)
- Education: Florence Academy of Fine Arts
- Occupations: Engraver, painter and engineer
- Years active: 1905–1945
- Notable work: Venezia. Chiesa della Madonna della Salute, Lucca. Ponte del Diavolo
- Style: Art deco, pastel, watercolor, tempera, oli, monotype, drypoint and etching
- Spouse: Maria Pia Poggi
- Children: Gianluigi Baglioni; Beatrice Baglioni
- Parents: Luigi Giuseppe Baglioni (father); Beatrice Zanardi di Francesco (mother)
- Relatives: Ugo Baglioni
- Family: Baglioni family

Signature
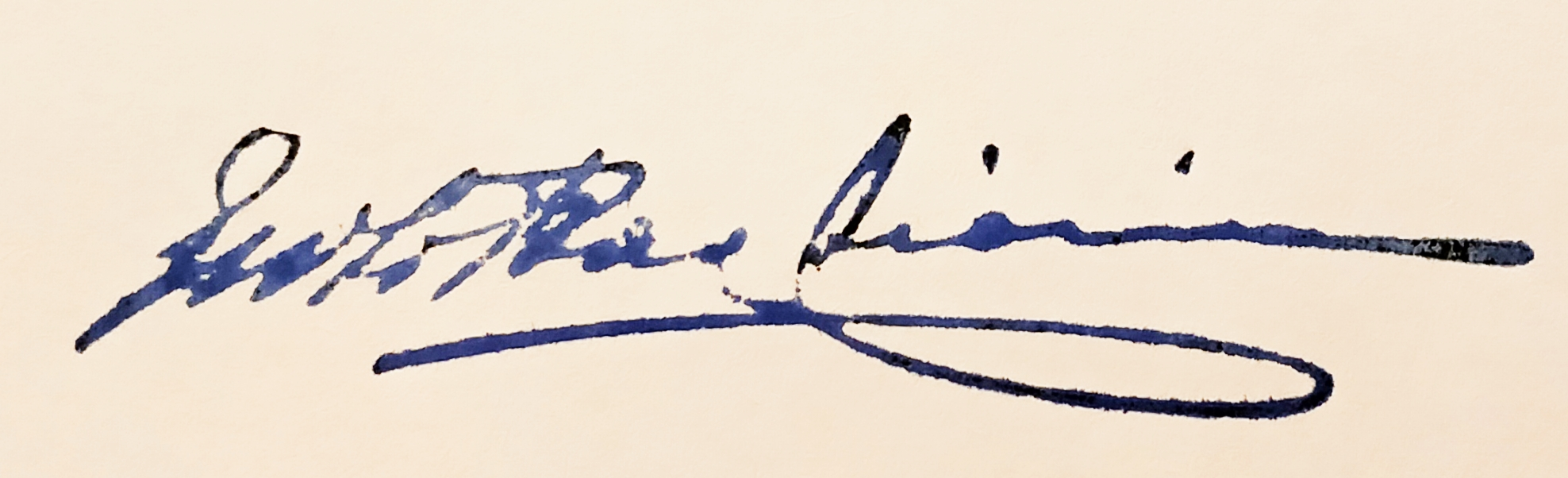

Giuseppe Enzo Baglioni (Ferrara, July 25, 1884 – San Nicolò, May 12, 1945) was an Italian engraver, painter and engineer.

== Biography ==
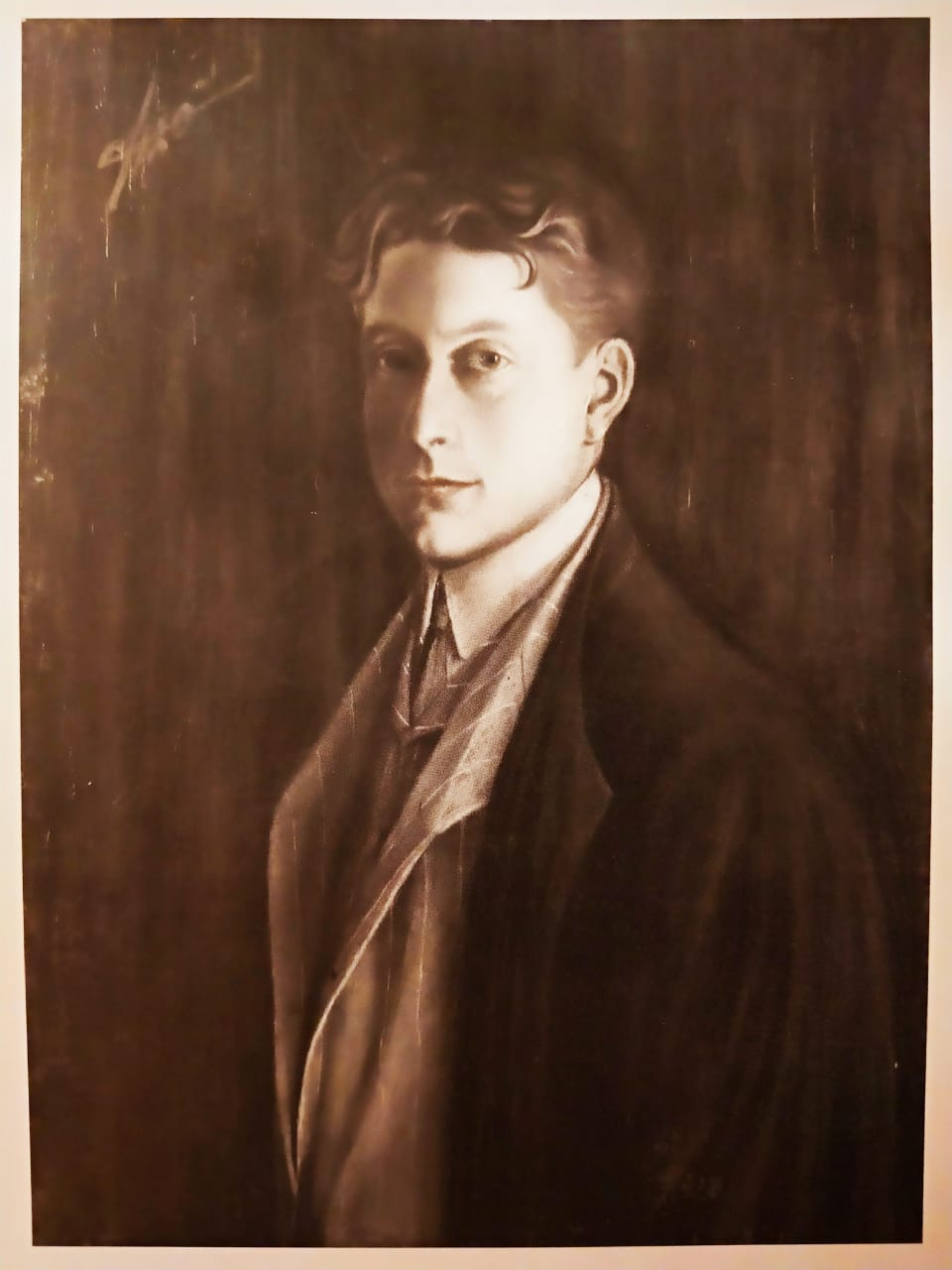
Self-portrait of Giuseppe E. Baglioni, 1905–1906.

Graduated in civil engineering and architecture in Bologna. From an early age he showed an interest in drawing. The first attempts were small pencil touch-ups and color sketches. Between 1905 and 1906 he tries to draw architectural details of old palaces, enjoying portraits and some pencil sketches. His family's social welfare situation leads him to cultivate several passions, including the violin, for which he will later compose some pieces, judged by music critics as "modern and attractive". In 1910 he experimented in the Cona countryside with a biplane model of his own invention, called "Baglioni", to later be tested in Bologna. While from an artistic point of view he remains anchored to the various techniques: pastel, watercolor, tempera and oil. After graduating in 1911, they began the first projects for small villas and funerary chapels that were characterized by an innate style that only later leaned towards a more rigorous déco; in 1912 he worked at the new headquarters of the Chamber of Deputies in Rome. The end of the War in Libya marks the occasion of his first job as a railway engineer for communication lines on the inaccessible roads between Massima and Asmara in Eritrea, spending 13 months in Africa. Later he moved to Paris, where he was interested in having experienced first-hand the dark continent and "primitive" art. On his return to Ferrara, he resumed his artistic activity with a technical choice that was the prelude to his future preference for printing: monotype. From here the conversion to deep drawing, acid and ink began to mature. In 1915 he was attached to the Directorate of Military Engineers in Florence. At the Academy of Fine Arts in Florence, he attended a specialization course to deepen and perfect the drypoint technique. The main objective is to participate as a competitor in the Exhibition of Fine Arts in Florence in 1917. Around 1918 he made a series of ten etchings on Venice; Over the years, other works dedicated to Venice were added to the archive. Of the latter he donated the first edition to Mussolini, whom he "sincerely thanked, describing them as beautiful". Staying for a long time in various cities in conjunction with design works in the field of construction and being a member of the Provincial Council for the History of the Fatherland, he creates similar productions divided by city: Florence, Rome, Bologna, Padua, Siena, Pompeii, Assisi, Milan and others last Ferrara, including dozens of works of various sizes.

At the Ferrares Art Exhibition of 1928, out of a hundred artists, only ten had a room for an individual exhibition, among them Baglioni. Later he was responsible for the architectural projects and interior fittings for the fairs in Milan, Bari and Bologna . In the following years he dealt less and less with the urban theme, often going to the Comacchio area, in the area of the great recovery. An enthusiastic participant in the excavation initiatives, he was one of the promoters of an Archaeological Museum in Ferrara, in the Ludovico il Moro Palace, which was inaugurated later in 1935. Embittered by the Fascist provisions and being a friend of many Ferrara Jews, he faced the news of the promulgation of the first racial laws with trepidation. With the start of the war, he spent more and more time in the old family home of Rero, where he moved his engraving workshop until he stayed there permanently, having left his home in Via Santo Stefano in the city. In this period, the succession of war events with the death of friends deeply upset him to the point of diverting his style. In fact, in his works there are vaudeville dancers, actors and technicians on a film set, a symbol of deception and a mocking stage fiction in the days of hatred and death.

In 1945 he was taken by the guerrillas from his house that had become the main one in the rural area of Ferrara 2 km from Tresigallo, only to be recognized by his son among those shot.

== Criticism ==
Interested in Art Deco forms, he found his artistic goal in the engraving technique, representing his native Ferrara, but also other Italian cities. Repeatedly named as a precursor of an artistic genre in the field of engraving. He was appreciated by illustrious contemporary fellow citizens such as Giuseppe Agnelli: "... these images are caressed and renewed by the Poet del Bulino with superior mastery, in a very personal way. Hence, each panel bears the mark of a moment of his soul, although the artist, timid, and I would say disdainful, with easy effects...", Gualtiero Medri: "...it is necessary, however, to reach our days to find an artist who deserves, for indisputable merits, the affix of master in the art of engraving... From his hands come assisted by a master's degree in drawing, a deep knowledge of the technique, tireless site work and an exquisite sense of art...", Filippo De Pisis: "...through the works that I saw of him, he showed himself to be an engraver of great technical skill and here and there also vigorous and synthetic... The impeccable precision of drawing and perspective shines through in the beautiful tones to make us think of the strong looks of Piranesi. . . Also for this reason, he could be classified as a good craftsman who respects the established rules", and Mimì Quilici Buzzacchi: "His mastery and technical knowledge, mixed with an eclectic style, presents a renaissance of the artistic expression of the greats of the past , as also described by art critic L. Scardino: "strong chiaroscuro by Enzo Baglioni, an engraver from Ferrara who almost looks like a reincarnation of Piranesi."

=== Main works ===
Part of a few hundred of his works are on display at the Giorgio Cini Foundation in Venice and the Museum of Modern Art in Bologna. The zinc and copper engraving plates of numerous subjects were donated by the family to the Cini Foundation, in Venice in May 1976.

=== Exhibitions ===
- 1905: Mostra Umoristica Nazionale organizzata dal Comitato Universitario, Palazzo dei Diamanti, Ferrara
- 1914: Esposizione Internazionale d'Arte della città di Venezia, Palazzo Correr, Venezia.
- 1917: Mostra di Belle Arti – Esposizione del Soldato, Palazzo Davanzati, Firenze . Mostra del Bianco e Nero, Palazzo Bentivoglio, Bologna.
- 1918: Mostra organizzata dalla Società "Francesco Francia", per le Belle Arti, Bologna.
- 1919: Pellicceria Obici, Corso Giovecca, Ferrara. Mostra di Beneficenza, Palazzo dei Diamanti, Ferrara.
- 1920: Mostra organizzata dalla Società "Francesco Francia", per le Belle Arti, Bologna (seconda volta). Esposizione d'Arte Ferrarese, organizzata dalla Società "Benvenuto Tisi", Palazzo dei Diamanti, Ferrara. Palazzo Arcivescovile, Ferrara. Palazzo Tassoni Mirogli, Ferrara. II Mostra Fotografica, Ferrara.
- 1922: Mostra organizzata dalla Società "Francesco Francia", Bologna.
- 1924: Mostra organizzata dalla Società "Francesco Francia", Bologna (seconda volta).
- 1925: Castello Estense, Ferrara.
- 1926: Esposizione d'Arte Ferrarese organizzata dalla Società "Benvenuto Tisi", Palazzo dei Diamanti, Ferrara. Mostra d'Arte promossa dall'Associazione Combattenti, Bologna.
- 1927: I Esposizione Nazionale dell'Arte del Paesaggio, Convento di San Domenico, Bologna. Mostra Internazionale dell'Incisione, Firenze. Mostra degli Amatori e Cultori d'Arte, Roma. Mostra d'arte della città di Fiume, Fiume, Croazia.
- 1928: Mostra d'Arte Ferrarese, Palazzo Sant'Anna, Ferrara.
- 1929: Esposizione della Montagna, Milano.
- 1931: Esposizione Internazionale d'Arte Sacra, Padova.
- 1932: Mostra d'Arte Benefica, Castello Estense, Ferrara.
- 1933: Mostra di Artisti Ferraresi, Atrio del Teatro Comunale, Ferrara.
- 1934: Mostra di Artisti Ferraresi, Atrio del Teatro Comunale, Ferrara (secoda volta). Il Mostra Nazionale dell'Agricoltura, Firenze. Mostra Nazionale del Paesaggio promossa dall'Associazione Nazionale per i paesaggi e i monumenti pittoreschi, Bologna.
- 1936: IV Mostra Sindacale d'Arte con la collaborazione della Società "Benvenuto Tisi", Borsa di Commercio, Ferrara.
- 1937: Mostra "Moretti", Palazzo Tassoni Mirogli, Ferrara.
- 1939: Mostra Sindacale d'Arte, Castello Estense, Ferrara.
- 2001: Incisori ferraresi del Novecento, Centro Mostre E.F.E.R., Ferrara / Antica Rocca, Cento.
- 2005: Mostra Enzo Baglioni. Impronte, Palazzo Massari, Ferrara.

== Awards ==
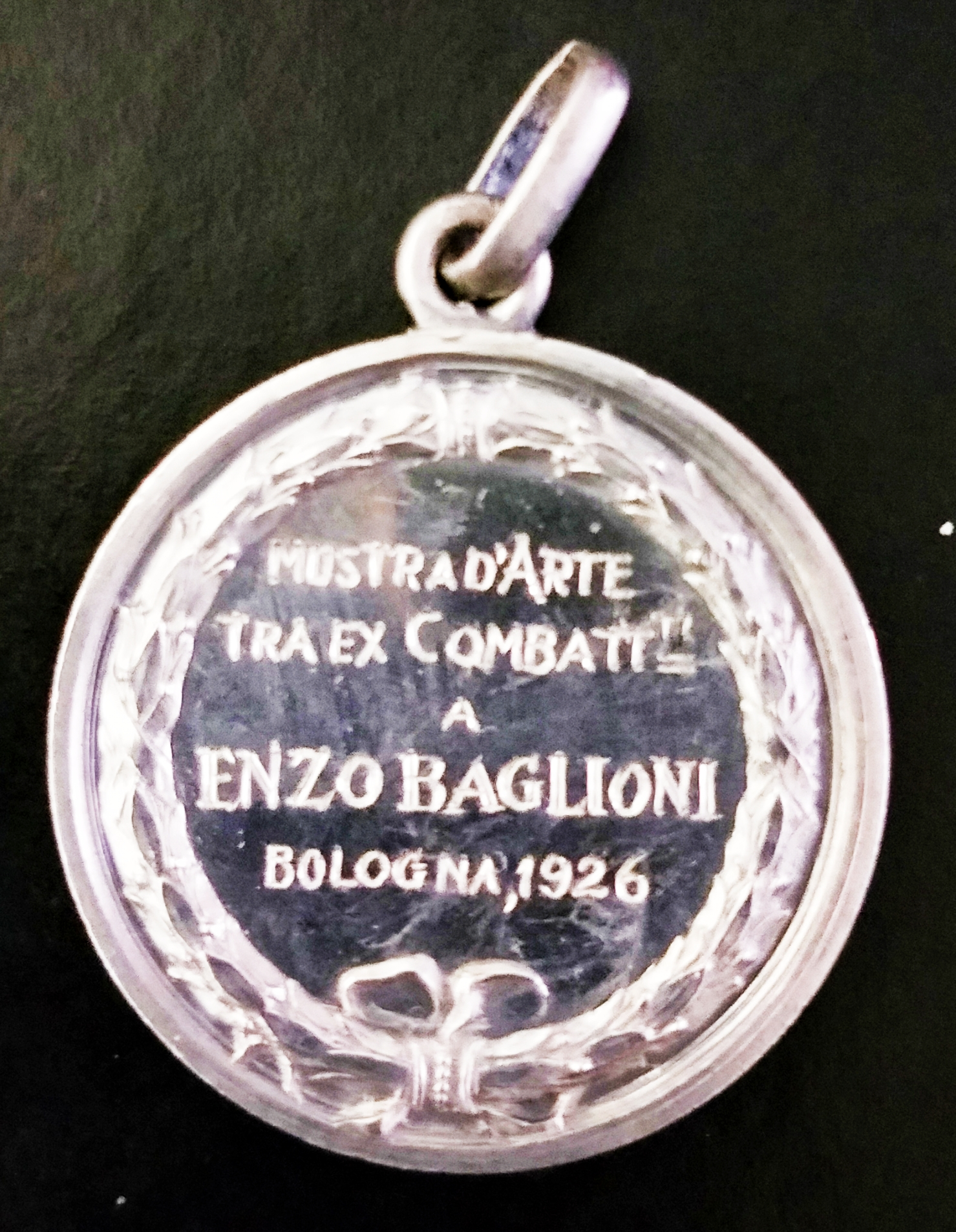
Silver Medal obtained in 1926.

- Silver medal: «Best etcher» (1917)
- Silver Medal: «for the complex of works» (1922)
- Silver Medal: «best landscape etching» (1924)
- Silver Medal: «Best burin work» (1926)
- Gold Medal: «Best Engraving» (1927)
- Gold Medal: «for etching "Devil's Bridge" » (1929)

== Image gallery ==
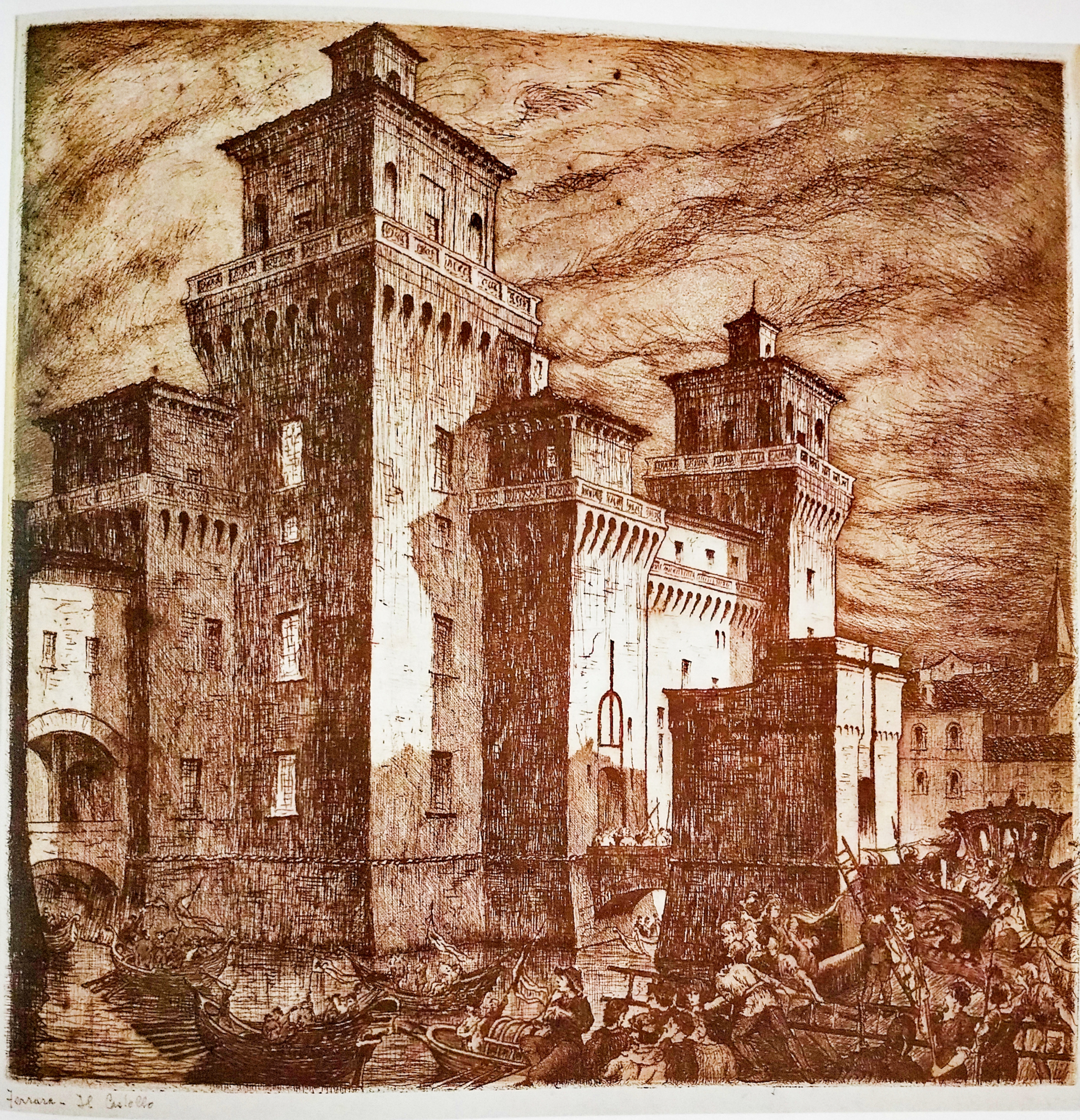
Castello, scena storica (1920).

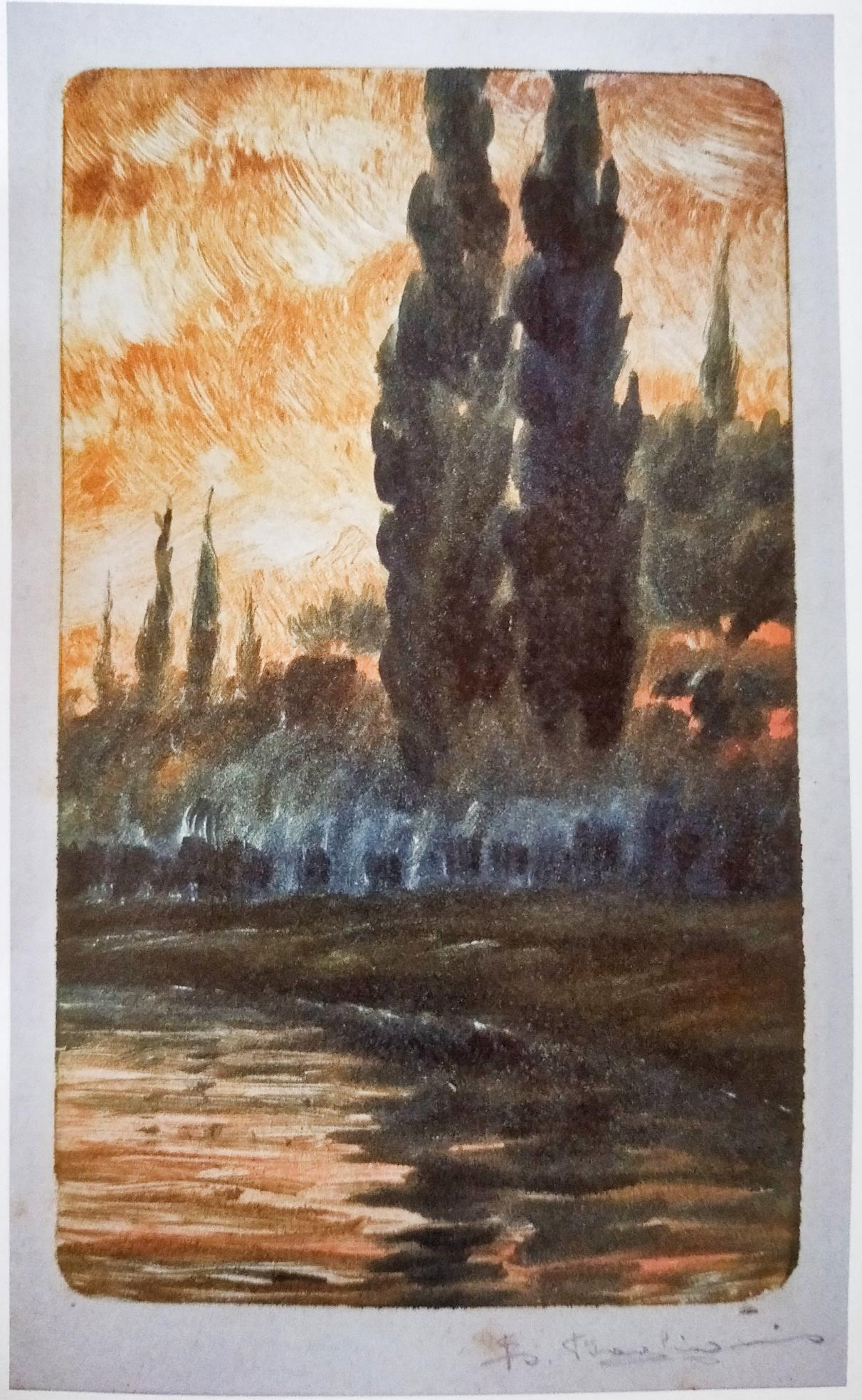
Paesaggio con alberi (1914).

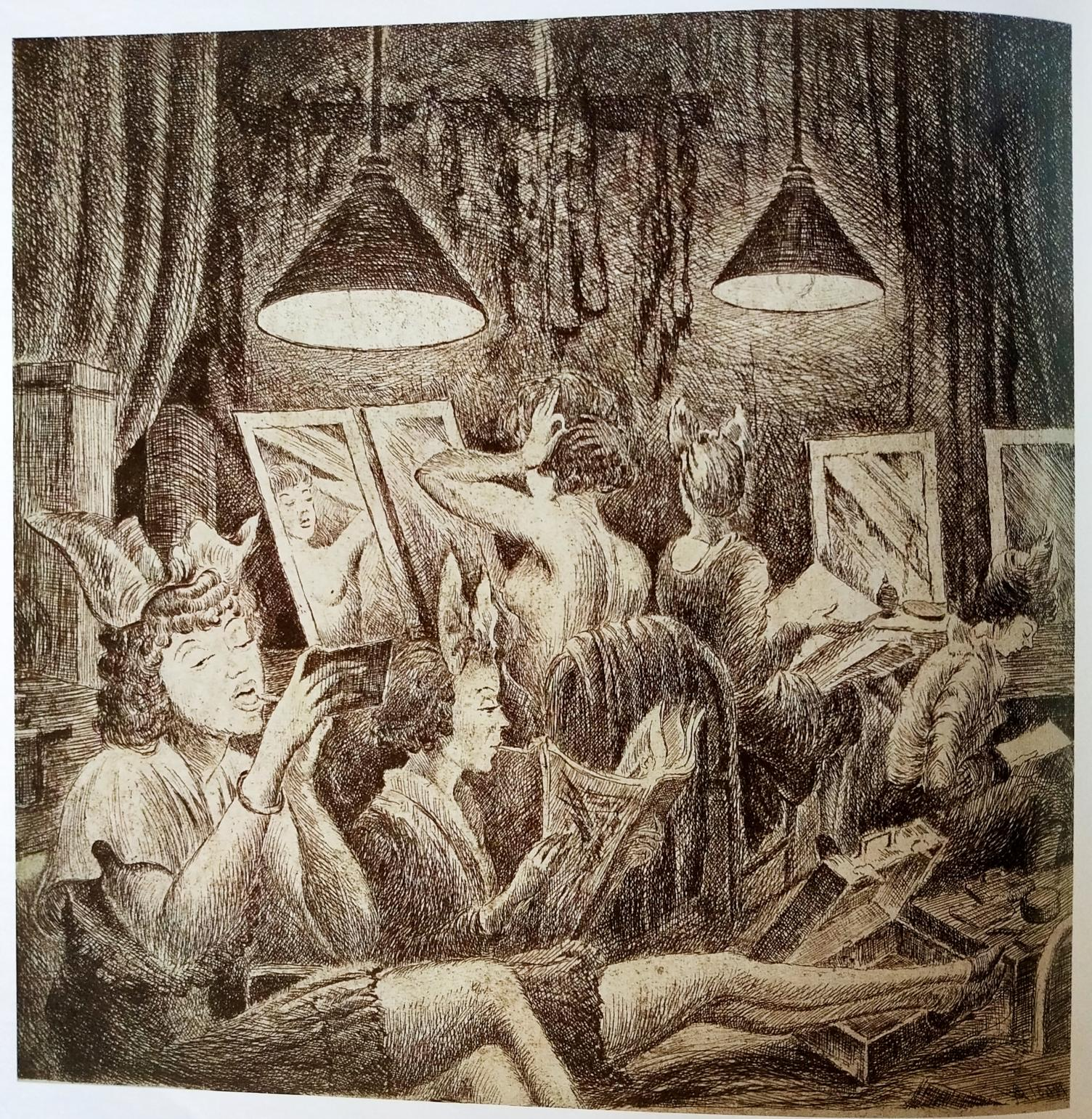
Dietro le Quinte (1943).

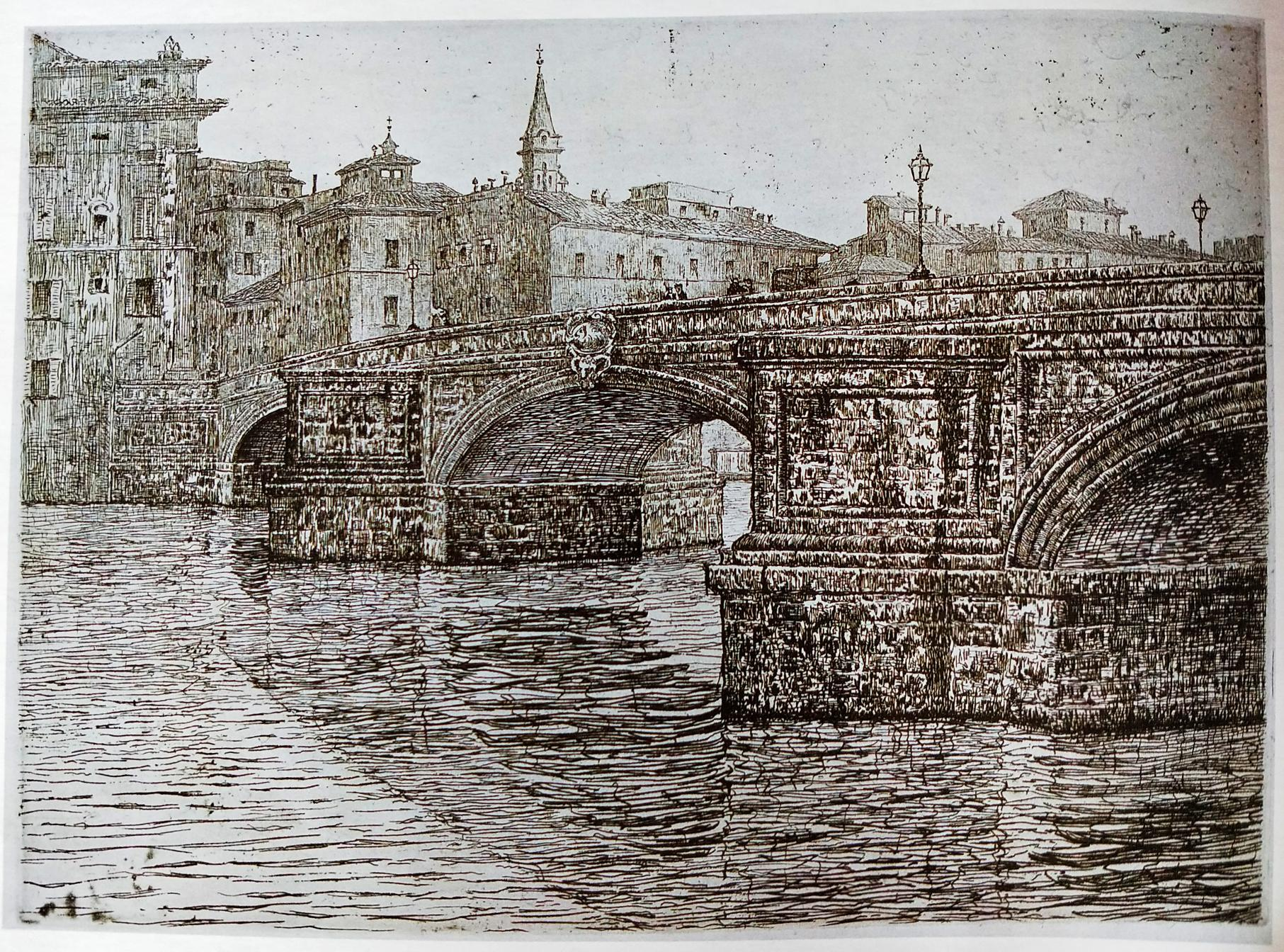
Ponte a S.Trinita (1917). Medaglia d'argento Mostra di Belle Arti Firenze 1917/18

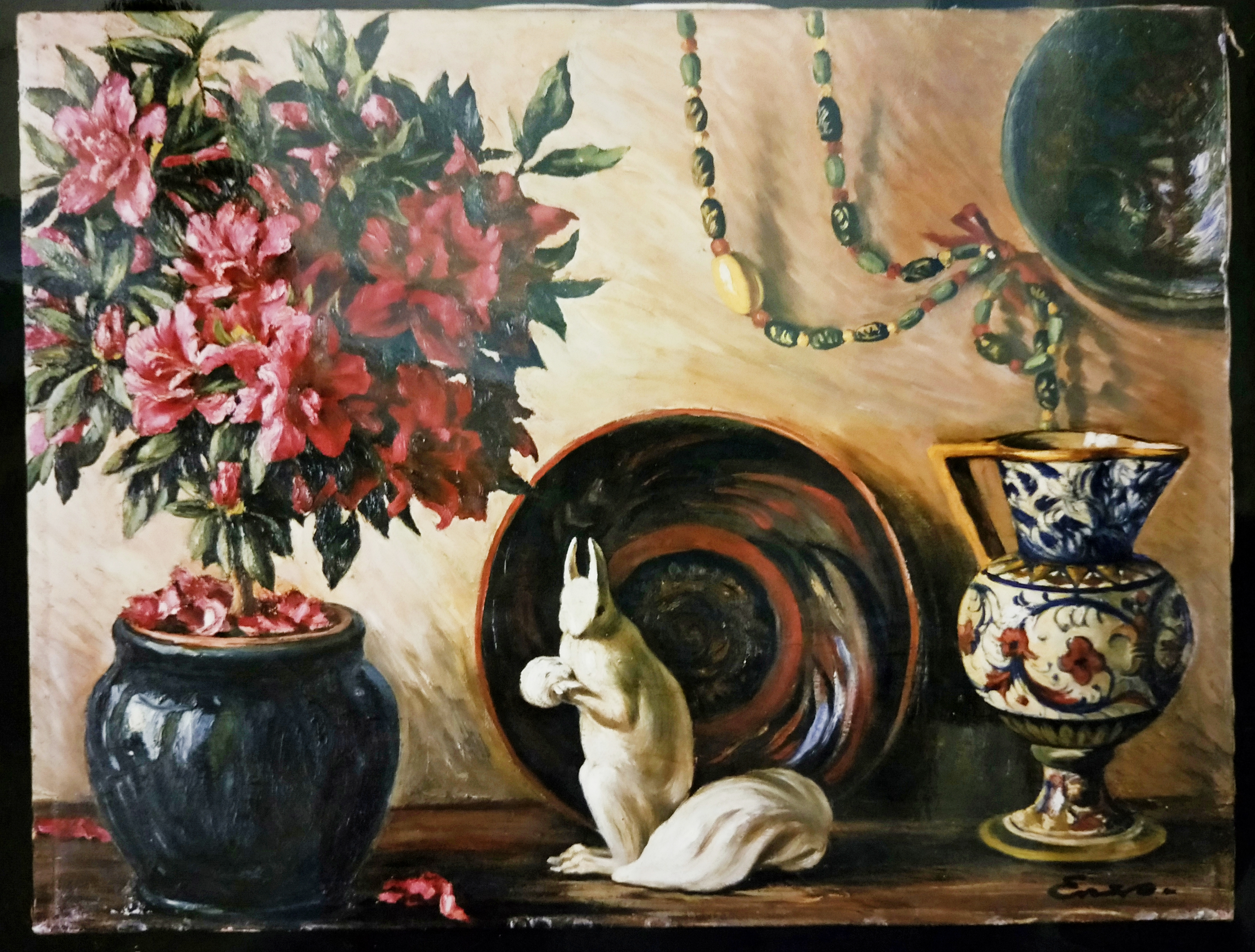
Natura morta "Scoiattolo" (Unknown year).

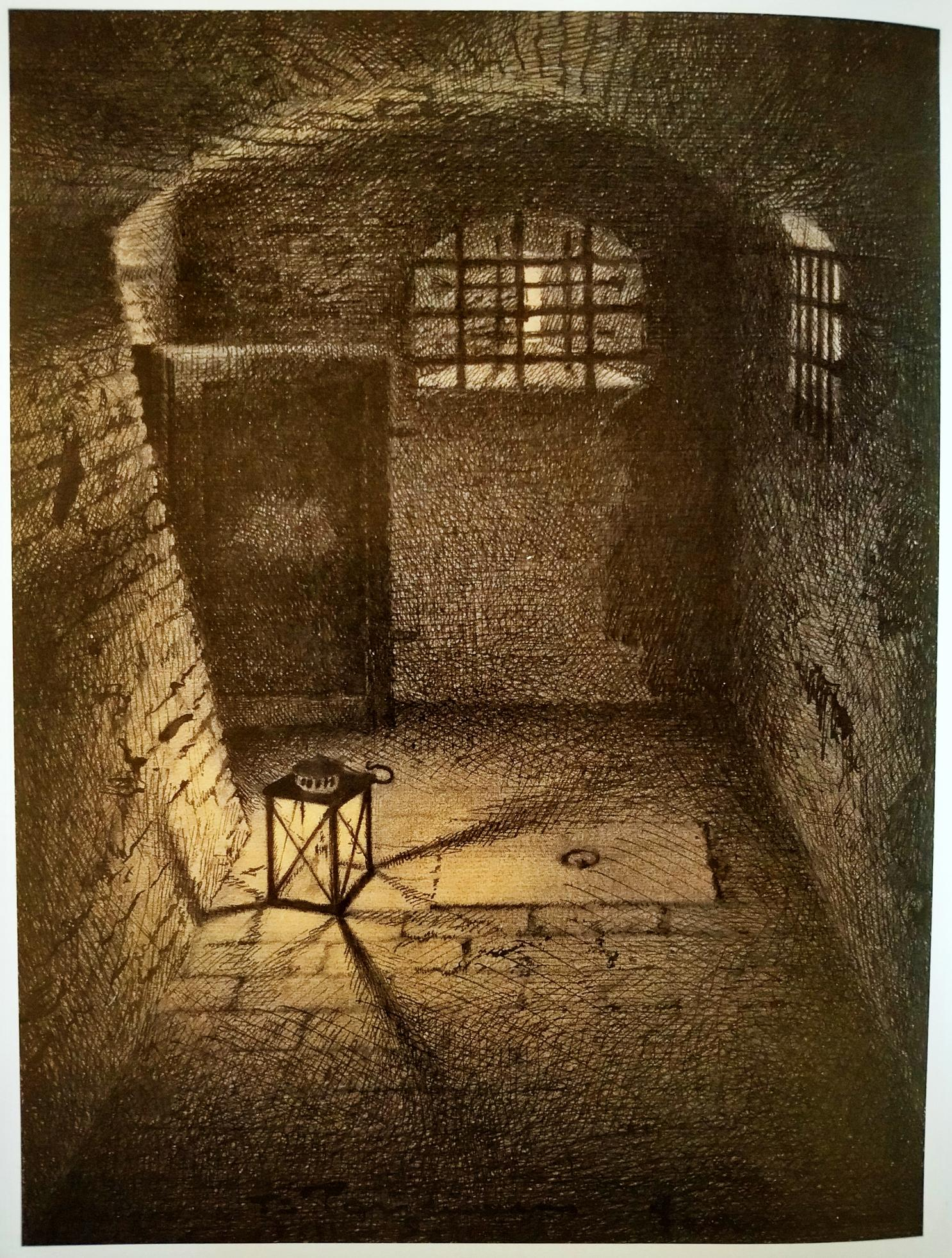
Prigione di Parisina (1926).

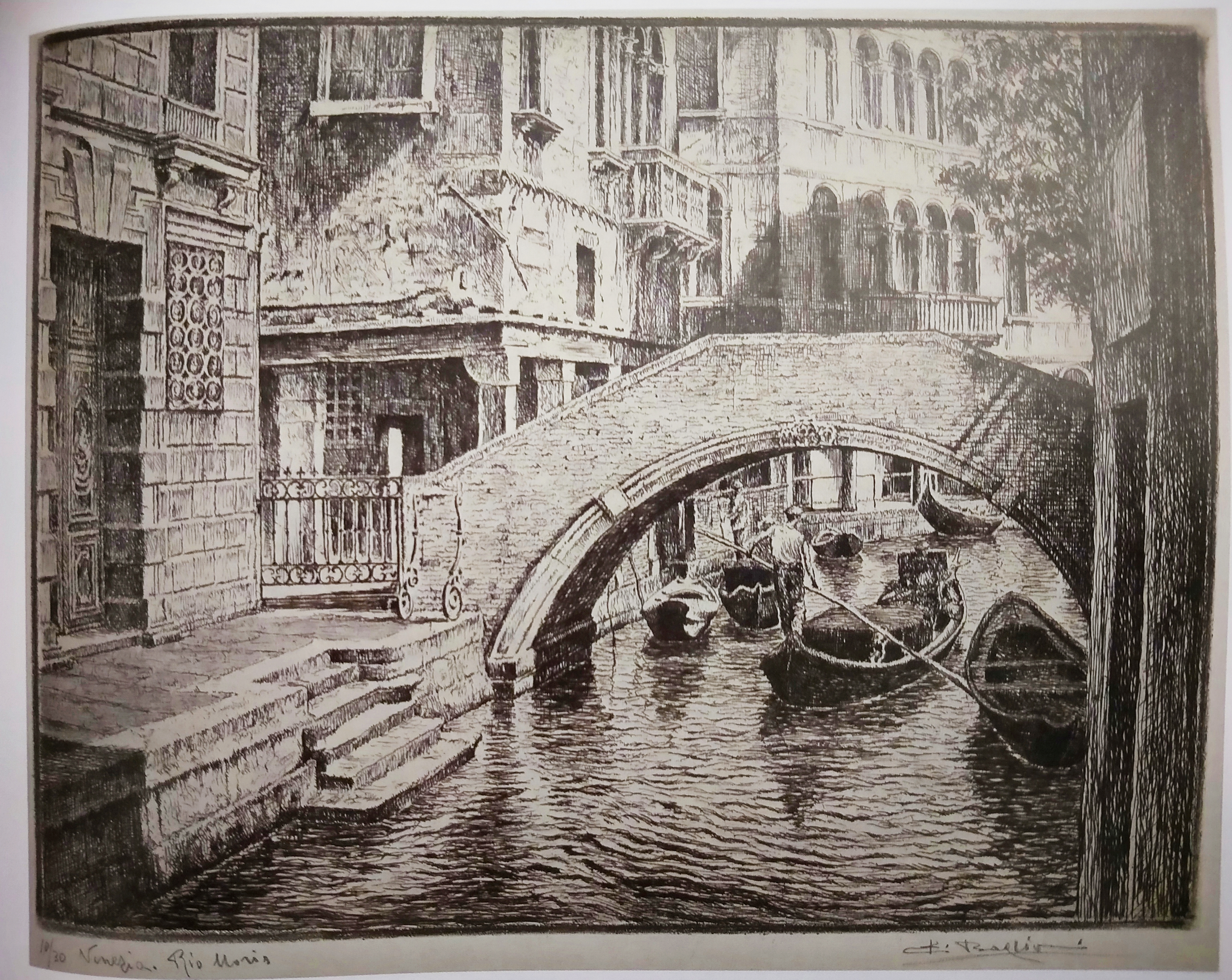
Rio Noris (1918).

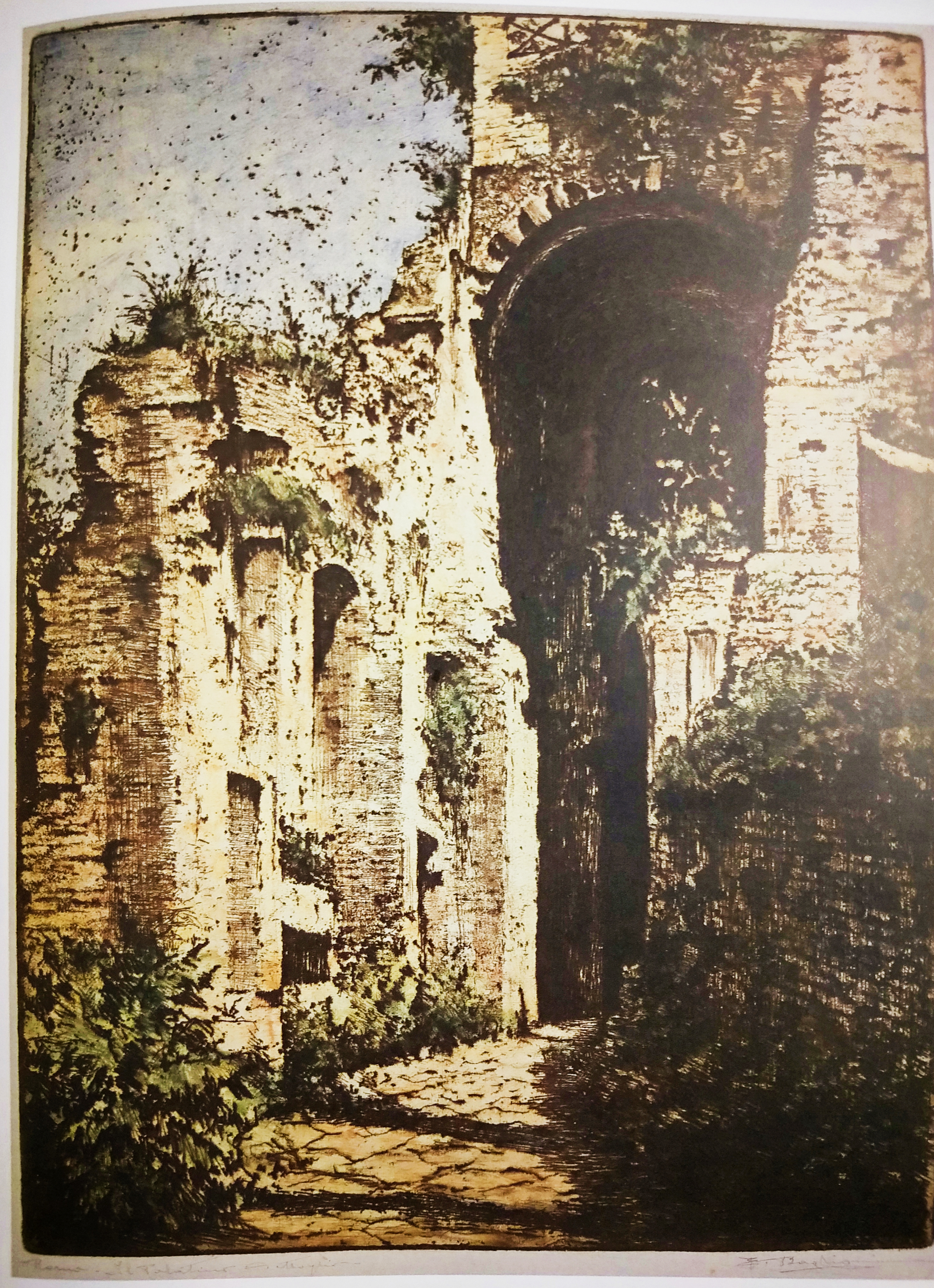
Roma. Il Palatino. Dettaglio (1924).

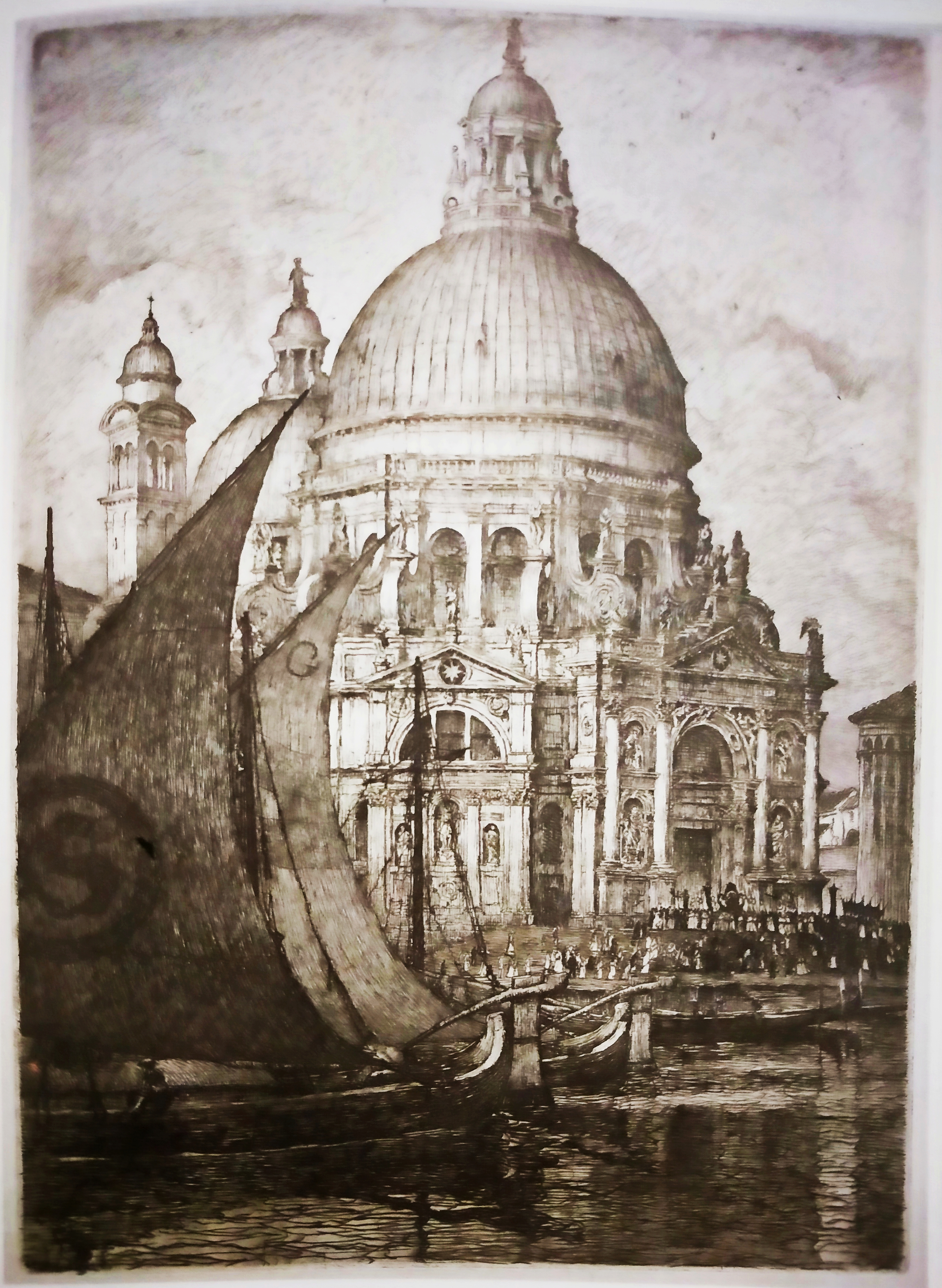
Venezia. Chiesa della Madonna della Salute (1919).

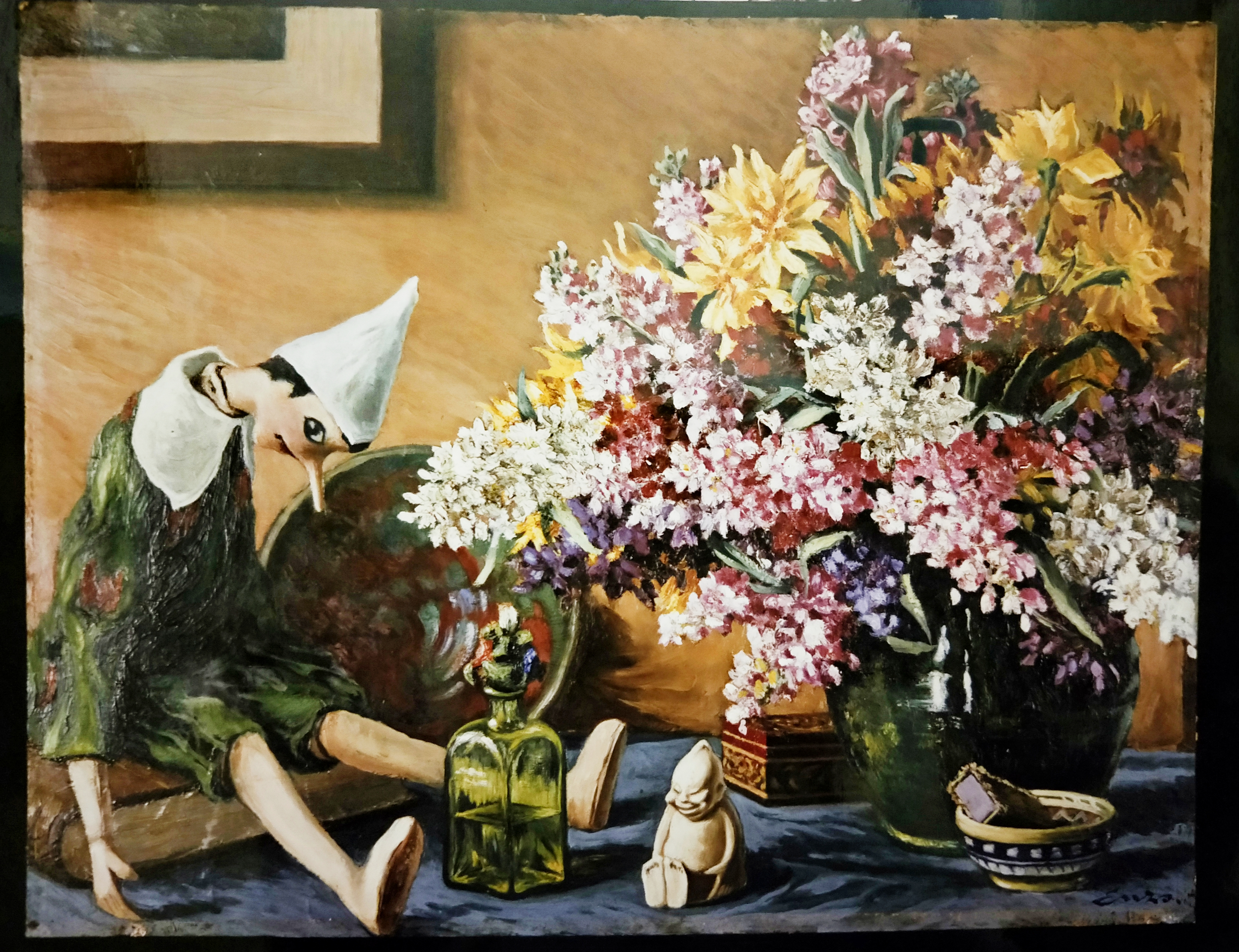
Natura morta "Pinocchio" (Unknown year).

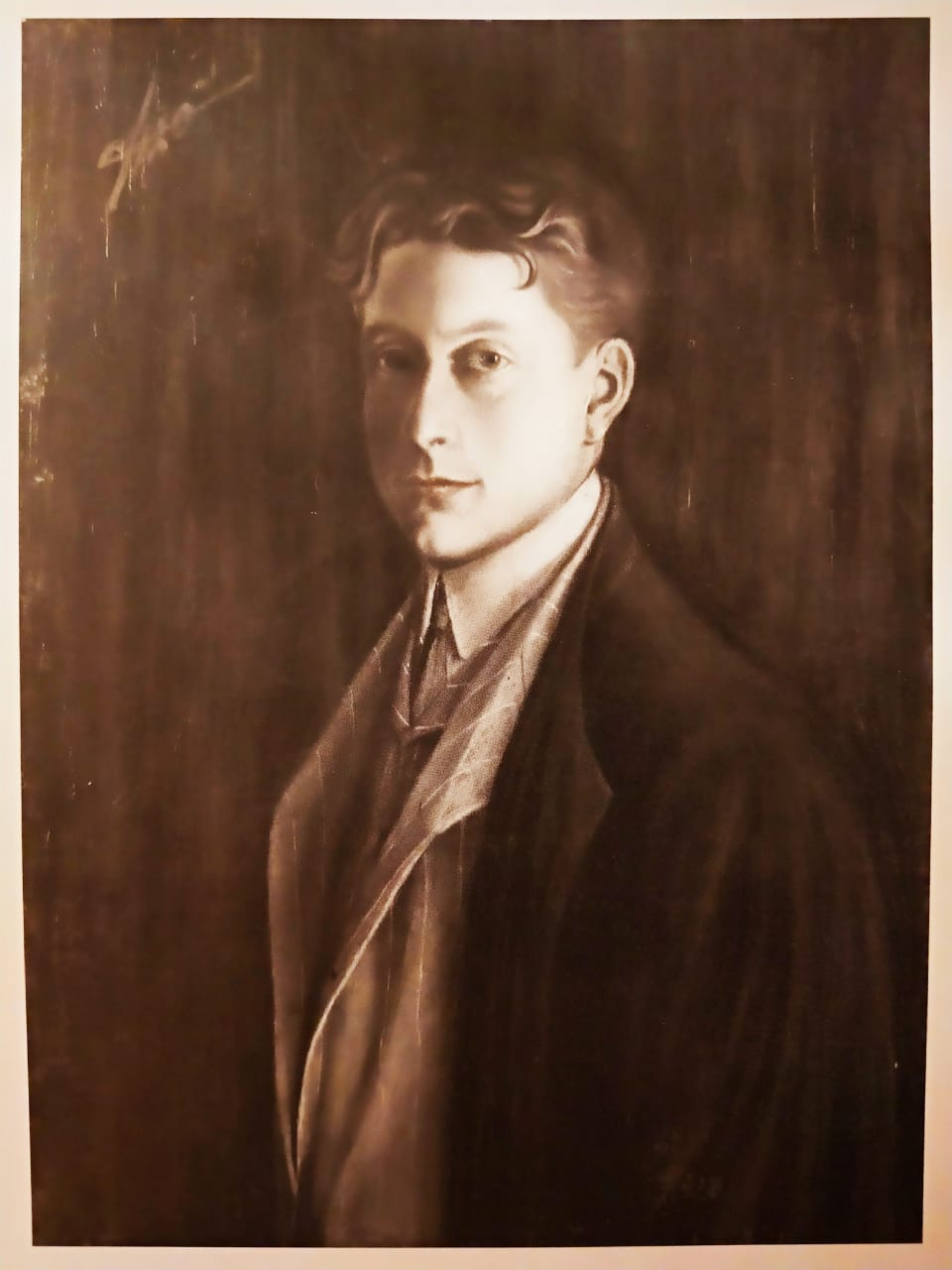
Autoritratto di Enzo Baglioni (1905).

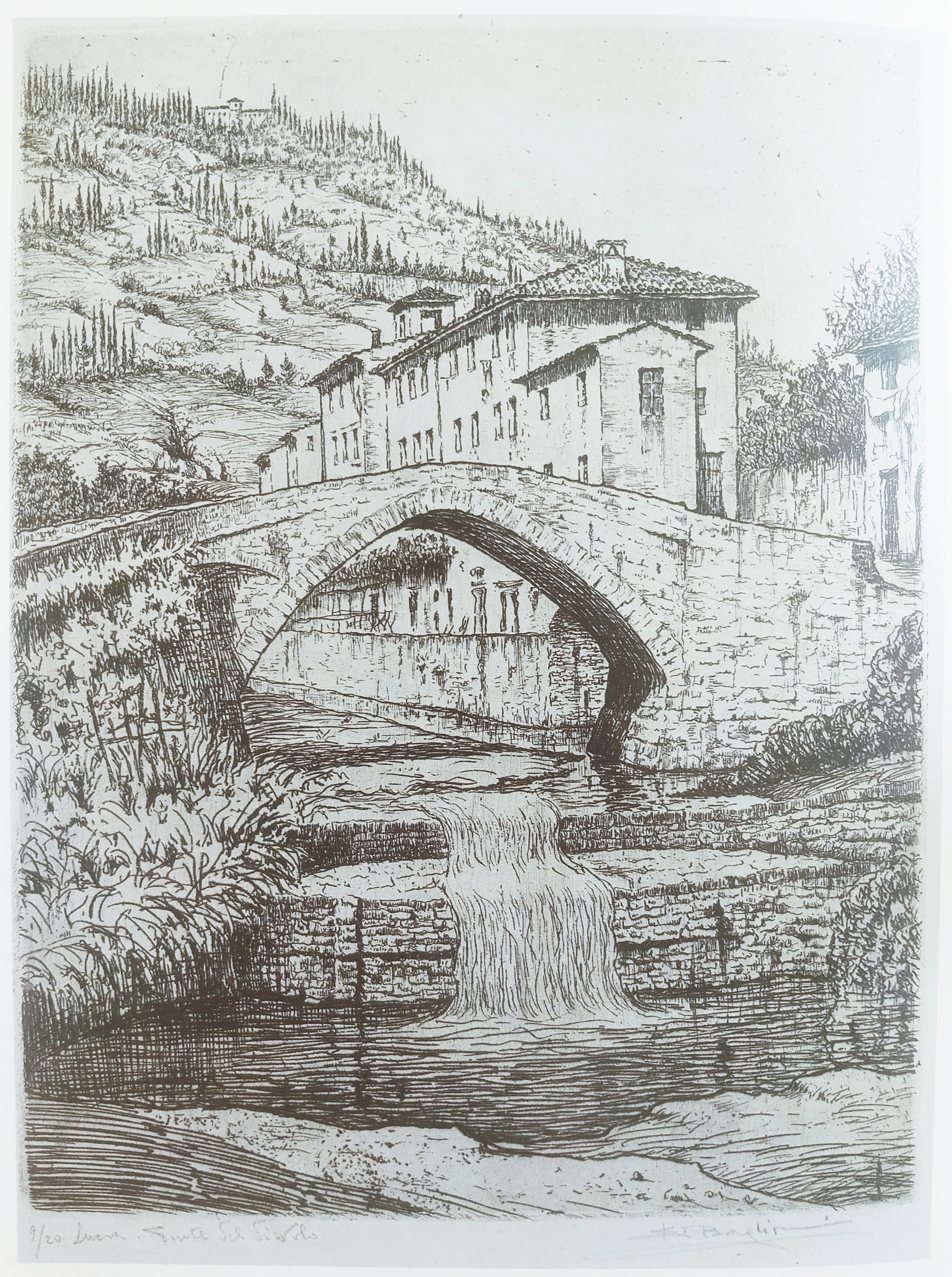
Lucca. Ponte del Diavolo (1929). Medaglia d'oro

== Bibliography ==
- 1919: Filippo de Pisis, Un artista concittadino – Enzo Baglioni, in «La Provincia». S. Sani, Note d'Arte – Pittori ferraresi.
- 1920: Catalogo della I Esposizione d'Arte Ferrarese – Promossa dalla Società "Benvenuto Tisi", Ferrara 1920, pp. 48, 51
- 1922: G. Gatti Casazza, Ferrara's Dominant Architectural Feature, in «The Spur», vol. XXIX, n.1, gennaio 1922, G. Agnelli, Ferrara in America, in «Gazzetta Ferrarese», 24 gennaio 1922.
- 1926: G. Agnelli, Ferrara:dieci acqueforti originali di Enzo Baglioni, Ferrara 1926 .
- 1926. C. Ratta, Acquafortisti italiani, 9 voll., Bologna, Scuola d'Arte Tipografica Comunale di Bologna, 1926, IV, ad vocem.
- 1927 G. Medri, Un maestro dell'acquaforte, Enzo Baglioni, in «Corriere Padano»,
- 1928: R., Enzo Baglioni, in «II Diamante», A. I, nn. 7–9, 30 agosto / 15 -30 settembre 1928, p. 15.
- 1929: Enzo Baglioni, in «La revue moderme illustrée des arts et de la vie», A. 29, n. 17, 15 settembre 1929, pp. 4 – 5.
- 1929: Mimì Quilici Buzzacchi, Autori, libri, editori, in "Corriere Padano" 1929.
- 1931: G. Carducci, Alla città di Ferrara nel XXV aprile del MDCCCXCV, in Rime e ritmi, II, Milano 1931 versi 33, 37.
- 1945: A.M. Comanducci, Dizionario illustrato dei pittori e incisori italiani moderni (1800–1900), 2 voll., Milano 1945, ad vocem, I, p. 32.
- 1953: E. Temussi, Umiltà e umanità di Mentessi – Il pittore che non-riusciva a fare il prezzo delle Sue opere, in «Gazzetta Padana», 25 ottobre 1953.
- 1955: L. Servolini, Dizionario italiano degli incisori italiani moderni e contemporanei, Milano 1955, ad vocem.
- 1966: O.A., La Ferrara di E. Baglioni, cartella per il XV Convegno Nazionale degli Ordini degli Ingegneri, 1966.
- 1976: A. Cavicchi, Baglioni (1884–1945), in «II Resto del Carlino», 2 dicembre 1976.
- 1977: A. Storelli, schede A52, A53, AG79, in II Liberty a Bologna e nell'Emilia Romagna, Bologna 1977, pp. 43, 114.
- 1978: G. Longhi, Quadri in cornice. Ferruccio Luppis, in «La Pianura», n. 3, 1978, p. 100.
- 1979: L. Scardino, Alla riscoperta degli artisti ferraresi – Enzo Baglioni (1884–1945), in «La Pianura», n. 2, 1979, pp. 66 – 67.
- 1982: A.M. Comanducci, Dizionario illustrato dei pittori, scultori, disegnatori e incisori italiani moderni e contemporanei, 6 voll., Milano 1982, ad vocem, I, p. 36.
- 1997: L. Scardino (a cura di), Filippo de Pisis pubblicista: Le collaborazioni ai giornali ferraresi (1915–1927), Ferrara 1997 PP. 87 – 88.
- 2001: L.Scardino (a cura di), Incisori ferraresi del Novecento, La Cattedrale di Ferrara 2001, pp. 12, 17 – 19.
- 2001: P. Bellini, Alcune note per una mostra sull'incisione a Ferrara nel XX secolo, in L. Scardino (a cura di), Incisori ferraresi del Novecento, Ferrara 2001, p. 4.
- 2005: C. Toschi Cavaliere, Enzo Baglioni. Impronte, catalogo della mostra, Palazzo Massari, Padiglione d'Arte Contemporanea, Ferrara.

Illustrations by Enzo Baglioni in books, magazines and newspapers

- 1921: «Il Maglio — Rassegna di tutte le arti», A. l, nn. 5 – 6 ottobre novembre 1921.
- 1929: «La rivista illustrata del popolo d'Italia», A.VII, n. 4, aprile 1929, p. 51. "Ospitalità italiana — Rivista turistica e Alberghiera», nn. I-III, 1929, pp. 15,19,63. Per l'educazione del consumatore, Municipio di Ferrara, s.d. [1929?], in copertina.
- 1933: "Il Corriere della Sera" 14 agosto 1933.
- 1937: La Cattedrale di Ferrara – 1135/1935, Verona 1937, pp. 88, 208.
- 1940: F. Balbo, Canti lirici, Ferrara 1940, p. 139. «Momento ferrarese», n. unico, dicembre 1976 – gennaio 1977, p. 1.
- 1951: «Mondo agricolo», 26 agosto 1951.
- 1976: G.A. Facchini, Il blezz ad Frara, Cento (FE) 1976, p. di copertina, pp. 49, 55, 67, 83, 215.
