= Giovanni delle Bande Nere =

Italian condottiero (1498–1526)

Ludovico di Giovanni de' Medici
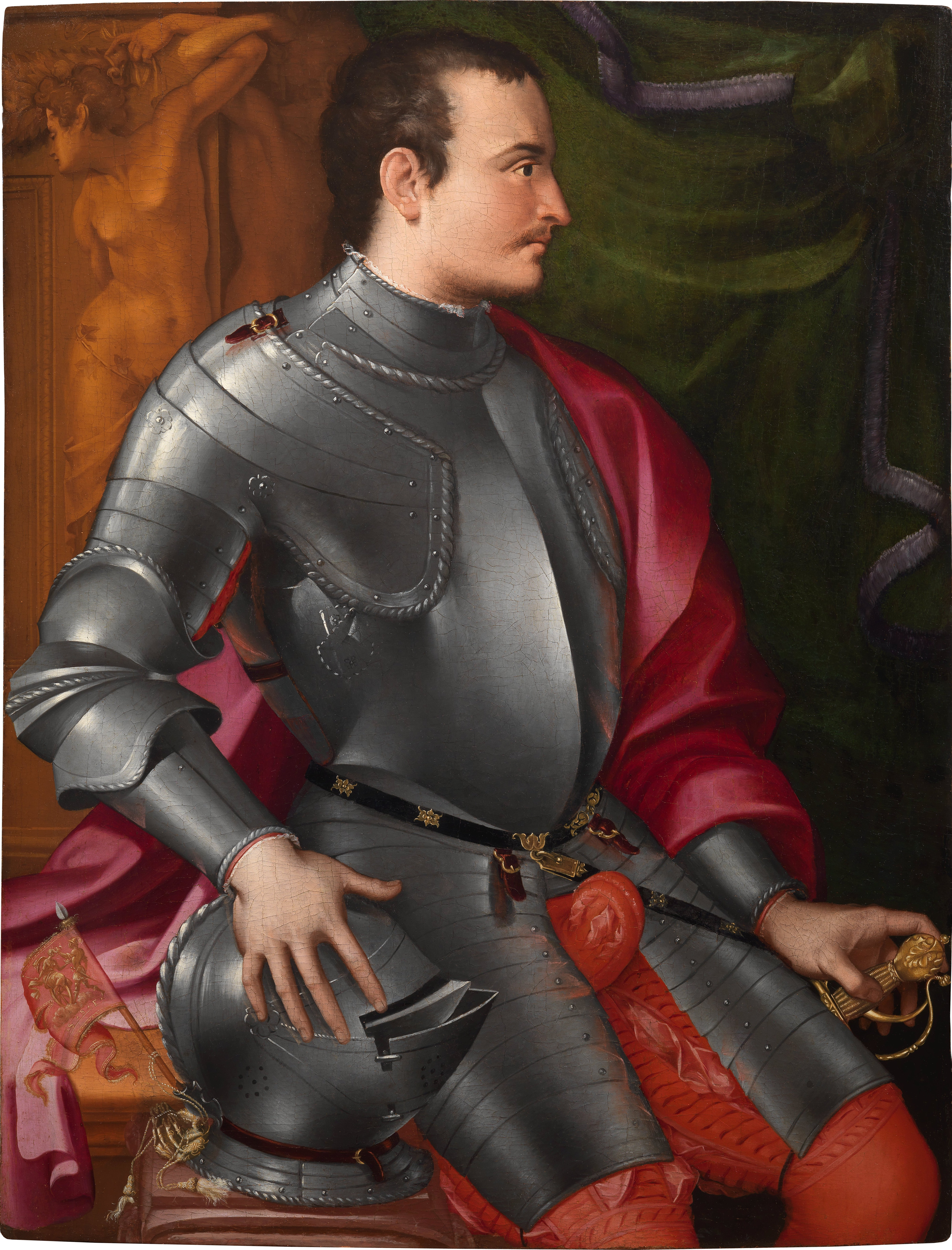
- Portrait of Giovanni by Carlo Portelli
- Born: 6 April 1498; Forlì, Papal States
- Died: 30 November 1526 (aged 28) (DOW); Mantua, Duchy of Mantua
- Noble family: Medici
- Spouse: Maria Salviati
- Issue: Cosimo I de' Medici, Grand Duke of Tuscany
- Father: Giovanni de' Medici il Popolano
- Mother: Caterina Sforza

Ludovico de' Medici, also known as Giovanni delle Bande Nere (6 April 1498 – 30 November 1526) was an Italian condottiero. He is known for leading the Black Bands and serving valiantly in military combat under his third cousins, Pope Leo X and Pope Clement VII, in the War of Urbino and the War of the League of Cognac, respectively.

== Early life ==
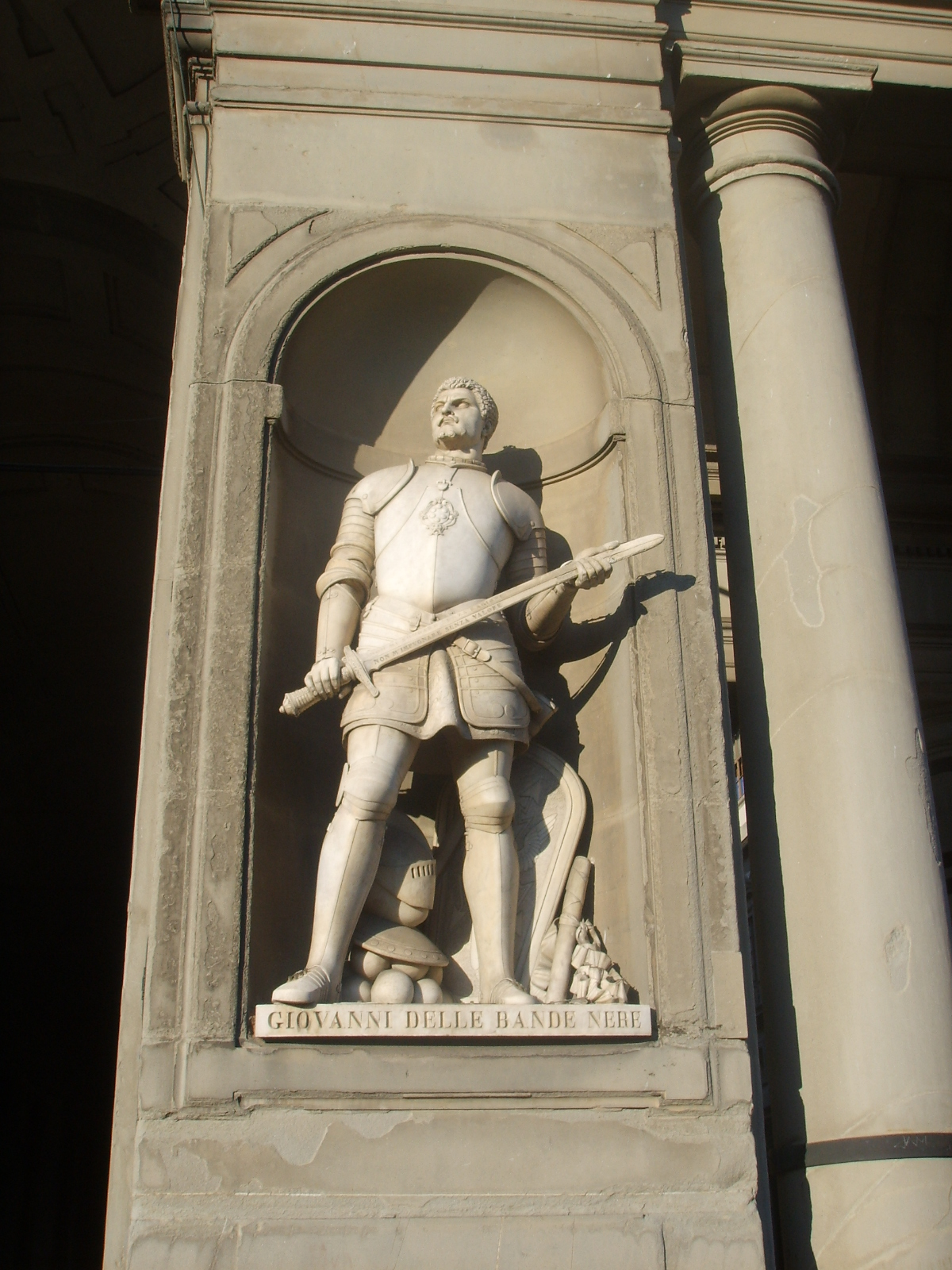
Statue at the Uffizi

Giovanni was born in the Northern Italian town of Forlì to Giovanni de' Medici il Popolano and Caterina Sforza, one of the most famous women of the Italian Renaissance.

From an early age, Giovanni demonstrated great interest and ability in physical activity, especially the martial arts of the age, such as horse riding and sword fighting. He committed his first murder at the age of 12, and was twice banished from the city of Florence for his unruly behaviour, including involvement in the rape of a sixteen-year-old boy, Giovanni being about thirteen at the time. He had a son, Cosimo (1519–1574), who went on to become the Grand Duke of Tuscany.

== Mercenary ==
Giovanni became a condottiero, or mercenary military captain, in the employ of his relative, Pope Leo X (Giovanni di Lorenzo de' Medici). On 5 March 1516 led the war against Francesco Maria I della Rovere, Duke of Urbino. He thenceforth formed a company of his own, mounted on light horses and specializing in fast but devastating skirmishing tactics and ambushes. In 1520 he defeated several rebel barons in the Marche.

With the outbreak of the Italian War of 1521–1526, Leo X allied with Emperor Charles V against King Francis I of France to regain Milan, Parma and Piacenza, so Giovanni was called in under the command of Prospero Colonna. They defeated the French at Vaprio d'Adda in November. As a symbol of mourning for the death of Pope Leo X on 1 December 1521, Giovanni added black stripes to his insignia, whence comes his nickname, Giovanni delle Bande Nere (or Giovanni of the Black Bands).

In 1522, left without the influence of his relative, he changed sides and joined the French, but was defeated by Colonna during the battle of Bicocca. In August 1523 he was hired again by the Imperial army, passing to assist Colonna, and in January 1524 he defeated the French and the Swiss at Caprino Bergamasco. He then participated with Fernando d'Ávalos in the battle of the Sesia.

In the same year another Medici, Giulio di Giuliano, became Pope and took the name of Clement VII. The new Pope paid all of Giovanni's debt, but in exchange ordered him to switch to the French side of the ongoing conflict. He did not take part in the battle of Pavia, but was soon severely wounded in a skirmish and later had to move to Piacenza to recuperate from his wounds.

In 1526, the War of the League of Cognac broke out. The League's captain general, Francesco Maria I della Rovere, abandoned Milan in the face of the overwhelming superiority of the Imperial army led by Georg von Frundsberg. Giovanni was able to defeat the Landsknechts rearguard, at the confluence of the Mincio with the Po River, but was forced to flee from the enemy artillery, which he believed they did not have.

== Death ==
On the evening of 25 November he was hit by a shot from a falconet in a battle near Governolo. According to a contemporary account by Luigi Guicciardini, the ball shattered his right leg above the knee and he had to be carried to San Nicolò Po, near Bagnolo San Vito, where no doctor could be found. He was taken to Aloisio Gonzaga's palace, marquis of Castel Goffredo, in Mantua, where the surgeon Abramo, who had cared for him two years earlier, amputated his leg. To perform the operation Abramo asked for 10 men to hold down the stricken condottiero.

Pietro Aretino, an eyewitness to the event, recalled in a letter to Francesco Albizi:

'Not even twenty' Giovanni said smiling 'could hold me', and he took a candle in his hand, so that he could make light onto himself, I ran away, and shutting my ears I heard only two voices, and then calling, and when I reached him he told me: 'I am healed', and turning all around he greatly rejoiced.

Despite the surgery, Giovanni de' Medici died five days later, supposedly of sepsis, on 30 November 1526.

Giovanni's body was exhumed in 2012 along with that of his wife to preserve the remains, which were damaged in the 1966 flood of the Arno River, and to ascertain the cause of his death. Preliminary investigation revealed that his leg was amputated below the knee. No damage was found to the thigh, where the shot supposedly hit. The tibia and fibula, the bones of the lower leg, were found sawed off from the amputation. There was no damage to the femur. It is now thought that de' Medici may have died of gangrene.

== Legacy ==
Giovanni popularized the usage of light cavalry and mounted arquebusiers, which he employed along with Fernando d'Ávalos to great effect in the Sesia. However, his premature death metaphorically signalled the end of the age of the condottieri, as otherwise, their mode of fighting (which emphasized armoured knights on horseback) was rendered practically obsolete by the introduction of pike-armed infantry. He is therefore known as the last of the great Italian condottieri. His lasting reputation has been kept alive in part thanks to Pietro Aretino, the Renaissance author, satirist, playwright and "scourge of the princes", who was Giovanni's close friend and accompanied him on some of his exploits.

== Later references ==
- A cruiser of the Regia Marina was named after Giovanni delle Bande Nere in 1930 and an offshore patrol vessel of the Marina Militare launched in 2022 bears his name.
- The 1937 film Condottieri drew parallels between the Bande Nere and Mussolini's black shirts.
- Ermanno Olmi's 2001 film The Profession of Arms, faithfully follows Giovanni delle Bande Nere in his last week of life, as he engages in battle with the Imperial forces amidst the cold, damp fields of the Lombard countryside.

== See also ==
- Italian Wars
- Condottieri
- Black Bands

== Sources ==
- Campbell, Katie (2021). Cultivating the Renaissance: A Social History of the Medici Tuscan Villas. Taylor & Francis. ISBN 9781000521009.
- Fletcher, Stella (2014). The Longman Companion to Renaissance Europe, 1390-1530. Routledge. ISBN 9781317885610.
- Knecht, Robert Jean (1994). Renaissance Warrior and Patron: The Reign of Francis I. Cambridge University Press. ISBN 9780521578851.
- Pilliod, Elizabeth (2021). "Cosimo I de' Medici: Lineage, Family, and Dynastic Ambitions". The Medici: Portraits and Politics, 1512-1570. Metropolitan Museum of Art. pp. 121–160. ISBN 9781588397300.
- Rocke, Michael (1996). Forbidden Friendships: Homosexuality and Male Culture in Renaissance Florence. Oxford University Press. ISBN 9780195122923.
- Taylor, Frederick Lewis (1973). The Art of War in Italy, 1494-1529. Greenwood Press. ISBN 0-8371-5025-6.
