= Baglioni family =

Noble family from Perugia

Baglioni
- Noble family
- Arma: "d'azzurro alla fascia d'oro" Cimiero: "mezzo grifone con coda di serpente, coronato con ali spiegate e tenente una spada diritta nella branca destra"
- Founded: Middle Ages
- Final ruler: Rodolfo II Baglioni
- Deposition: 1540 (in Perugia)

The House of Baglioni is an Umbrian noble family that ruled over the city of Perugia between 1438 and 1540, when Rodolfo II Baglioni had to surrender the city to the papal troops of Pope Paul III after the Salt War. At that point, Perugia came under the control of the Papal States.

Descendants of the family exist to the present day, including the French branch of Baglion de la Dufferie, which once owned the Château de la Motte-Husson in the Mayenne department of France, which is the setting for the Channel 4 programme Escape to the Chateau.

== History ==
=== Lords of Perugia (1438–1540) ===
Title	Name	From	To	Consort
Seigneur di Cannara, Spello e Bettona	Malatesta I	1416	1437	Iacopa Fortebracci
Signore di Perugia	Braccio I	1438	1479	Toderina Fregoso, Anastasia Sforza di Santa Fiora
Signore	Guido I	1479	1500	Costanza Varano
Signore	Rodolfo I	1479	1500	Francesca Baglioni di Castel di Piero
Signore	Astorre I	1479	1500	Lavinia Colonna
Signore	Federico, detto Grifonetto	15 July 1500		Zenobia Sforza di Santa Fiora
Signore	Carlo I il Barciglia	15 July 1500		
Signore	Gian Paolo I	1500	1520	Ippolita Conti
Signore	Adriano I il Morgante	1500	1502	
Signore	Gentile I Baglioni	1520	1527	Giulia Vitelli
Signore	Malatesta IV	1527	1531	Monaldesca Monaldeschi; Malatesta II and III
Signore	Orazio II	1527	1528	Francesca Petrucci; Orazio I
Signore	Rodolfo II	1531	1540	Costanza Vitelli

== Notable members ==
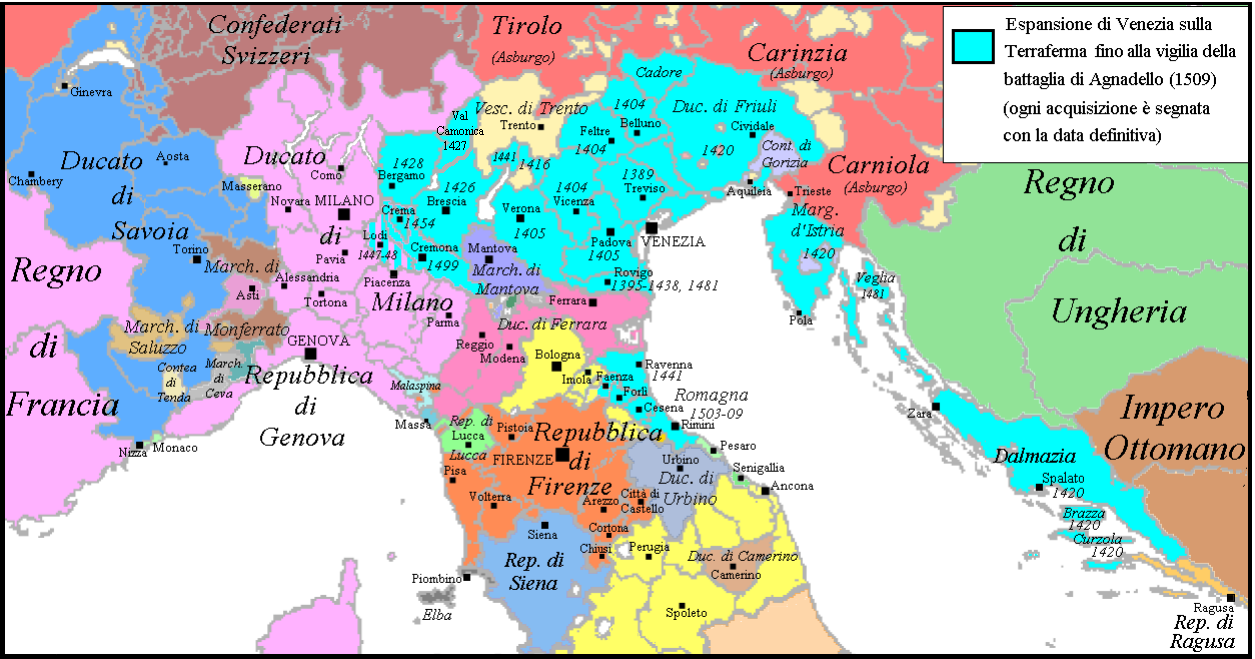
Signoria di Perugia

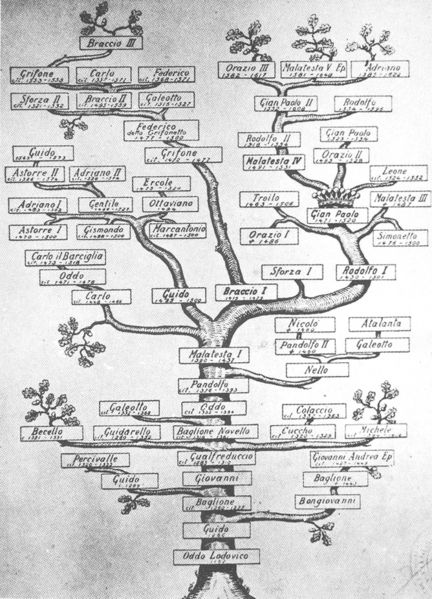
Family tree about the notable members

- Malatesta Baglioni (d. 1437)
- Grifone Baglioni
- Braccio I Baglioni (1419 - December 1479), son of Malatesta Baglioni
- Carlo Baglioni (di Malatesta) (d. 1485)
- Orazio Baglioni
- Gentile Baglioni (1466 - August 1527)
- Carlo Baglioni (1473 - December 1518)
- Giampaolo Baglioni (c. 1470- June 1520)
- Astorre Baglioni (di Guido)
- Grifonetto Baglioni
- Morgante Baglioni (d. July 1502)
- Orazio di Giampaolo Baglioni (1493 - May 1528)
- Malatesta IV Baglioni (di Giampaolo) (1491 - December 1531)
- Sforza Baglioni (d. September 1532)
- Braccio II Baglioni (d. November 1559)
- Rodolfo II Baglioni (July 1512 - March 1554)
- Federico Baglioni
- Astorre Baglioni (March 1526 - 4 August 1571)
- Adriano Baglioni (March 1527 - April 1574)
- Giuseppe Enzo Baglioni (July 1884 - May 1945)
