= Black Bands =

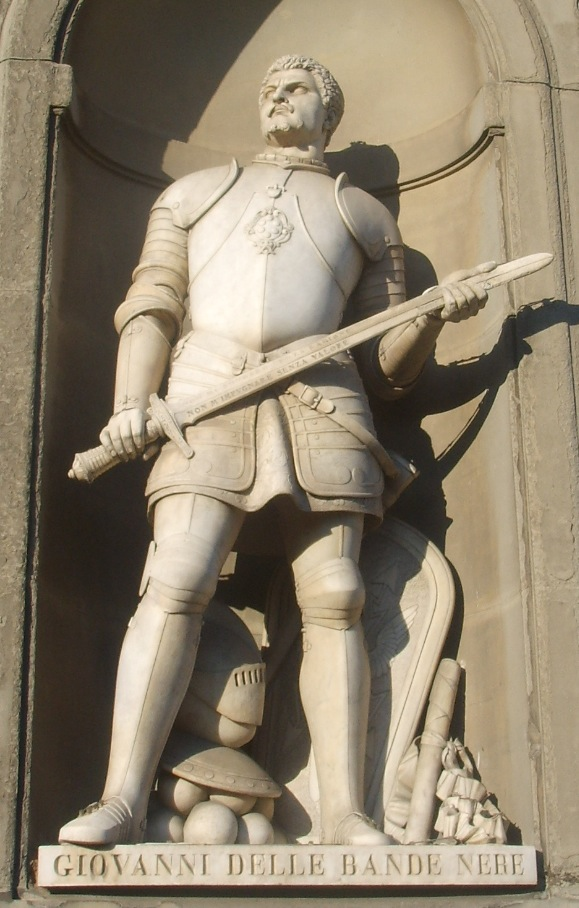
- Statue of the commander Giovanni de' Medici (also known as Giovanni delle Bande Nere) at the Uffizi Gallery in Florence, Italy.
- Active: 1517?–1528
- Size: 1,000–4,000
- Engagements: Italian Wars

Commanders
- Notable commanders: Giovanni de' Medici

The Black Bands (Italian: Bande Nere), sometimes referred to as the Black Bands of Giovanni, was a company of Italian mercenaries formed and commanded by Giovanni de' Medici during the Italian Wars; their name came from their black mourning colours for the death of Pope Leo X. Composed primarily of arquebusiers—including Europe's first mounted arquebusiers—the company was, by the Italian War of 1521, considered to be the finest Italian troops available. Initially in the service of Charles de Lannoy and the Pope, the company fought at Bicocca in 1522 and the Sesia in 1523. A pay dispute led to it transferring its allegiance to Francis I of France; it took part in the Battle of Pavia under the command of Richard de la Pole (d. 1525), known as the "White Rose". In addition to the Italian units, German mercenaries in service of Francis I were called the "German black bands".

At the start of the War of the League of Cognac, the Bands attempted to resist the advance of Georg Frundsberg's Imperial landsknechts into Lombardy. Giovanni was killed by a cannonball near Mantua early in 1526. The company continued to fight in French and Papal pay, taking part in the expedition to Naples under Odet de Foix, Vicomte de Lautrec. It retreated from the siege with the remainder of the French army—crippled by the plague—and surrendered to the Imperial forces in late 1528, disbanding shortly afterwards.
