= Law of Vatican City =

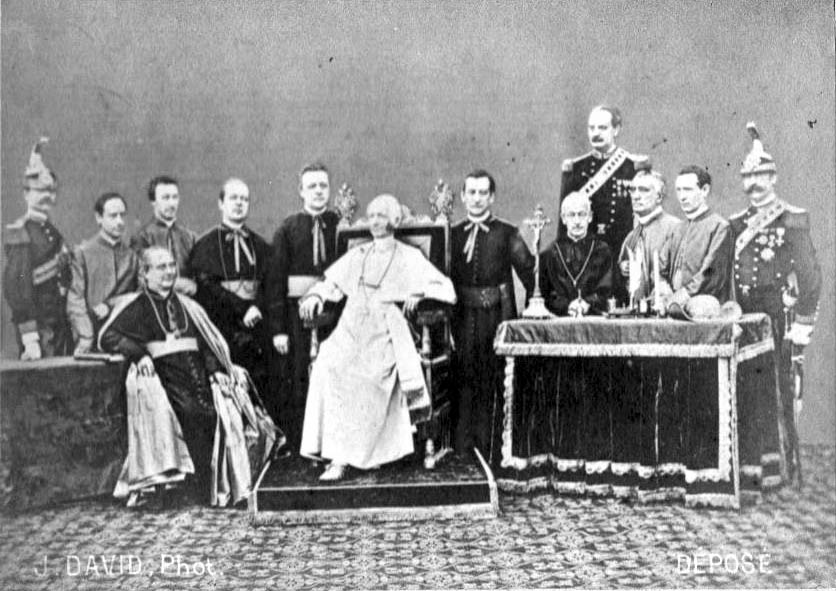
Pope Leo XIII and his inner court at the Vatican, photographed by Jules David in 1878.

The law of Vatican City State consists of many forms, the most important of which is the canon law of the Catholic Church. The organs of state are governed by the Fundamental Law of Vatican City State. The Code of Penal Procedure governs tribunals and the Lateran Treaty governs relations with the Italian Republic.

== Canon law ==
The canon law of the Catholic Church is supreme in the civil legal system of Vatican City State. The Supreme Tribunal of the Apostolic Signatura, a dicastery of the Roman Curia and the highest canonical tribunal, is also the final court of cassation in the civil legal system of Vatican City State. Its competence includes appeals concerning legal procedure and judicial competence. According to a 2008 law issued by Pope Benedict XVI, the civil legal system of Vatican City State recognizes canon law as its first source of norms and first principle of interpretation. Pope Francis has stated that principles of canon law are essential to the interpretation and application of the laws of Vatican City State.

== Fundamental Law ==
The Fundamental Law of Vatican City State governs the civil government of Vatican City State.

The first Fundamental Law of Vatican City was promulgated by Pope Pius XI on 7 June 1929.

Pope John Paul II promulgated a new version of the Fundamental Law on 26 November 2000. It obtained the force of law on 22 February 2001, Feast of the Chair of St. Peter, and replaced in its entirety the previous Law. All the norms in force in Vatican City State which were not in agreement with the new Law were abrogated.

In April 2023, Pope Francis promulgated a new Fundamental Law. This new version entered into force the same year.

== Curia law ==
The apostolic constitution Praedicate evangelium governs the Roman Curia which assists the pope in the governance of the Catholic Church.

== Positive civil and penal law ==
Most of the positive and penal civil law—in contrast to canon law with civil effects—is based on the Italian code from 1889. It was outdated in many ways. This was amended in a major fashion in 2013 to include a number of United Nations Conventions the state has signed over the years, as well as bringing it up to date. The penal code now includes specifics defining money laundering, explicit listing of sexual crimes, and violating confidentiality. Since life imprisonment was abolished by Pope Francis in 2013, the maximum penalty is 30 to 35 years of imprisonment.

In 2008, Vatican City announced that it will no longer automatically adopt new Italian laws, as many Italian laws diverge from Catholic doctrine. The announcement came in the wake of conflict over right-to-life issues following the Eluana Englaro case. Existing law provided that Italian laws were accepted automatically except on bilateral treaties or those that have a sharp divergence with basic canon law. Under the new procedure, the Vatican would examine Italian laws before deciding whether to adopt them. However, as the Vatican had not always accepted Italian laws under the old procedure little would change, with one newspaper commentator calling the announcement a "masked warning" to the Italian government.

On March 29, 2019, one month after a historic Vatican sex abuse summit was held, Pope Francis issued a new Vatican City law requiring Vatican City officials, including those in the Roman Curia, and foreign nuncios affiliated with the Vatican government, to report sex abuse. Failure to do so can result in a fine of up to 5,000 euros (about $5,600) or, in the case of a Vatican gendarme, up to six months in prison. The statute of limitations was also increased from 4 years to 20 years and any Vatican employee found guilty will be dismissed on a mandatory basis. On May 9, 2019, a new law was issued to male and female church workers not just in the Vatican, but throughout the world to disclose any report of sex abuse.

In February 2021, Pope Francis amended articles 17, 376, 379 of the penal code of the Vatican. "These changes may affect the Vatican’s impending trial of the 39-year-old Italian woman Cecilia Marogna, who has been accused of embezzlement, which she denies."

In April 2021, Pope Francis published an apostolic letter motu proprio to change some articles so that Vatican City court can judge cardinals and bishops.

== International law ==
Officials of the State of Vatican City have diplomatic immunity under international law. Hence, if they are accused of a crime in their host country, they are ordinarily recalled to the State of Vatican City to face civil trial, and, if applicable, to face canonical trial at the Congregation for the Doctrine of the Faith (CDF) or competent dicastery. Under the 2022 Apostolic Constitution, however, the authority of the CDF was weakened, and the Pontifical Commission for the Protection of Minors joined the Roman Curia with greater authority as well. A new “super dicastery” which promotes evangelization now serves as the main institution in the Roman Curia.

== Judiciary ==
The judicial system of Vatican City consists of:

- a sole judge (Giudice Unico, Solus Iudex or Iudex Unicus) with limited jurisdiction
- a tribunal (tribunale, atrium) with four members
- the Court of Appeal (Corte d'Appello, Curia Appellationis) with four members
- the Court of Cassation (Corte di Cassazione, Curia Cassationis), which has three members and is the supreme court of the Vatican City State

Justice is exercised in the name of the Supreme Pontiff.

In March 2020, it was announced that Pope Francis signed a new motu proprio into law on March 13, 2020, which reforms the Vatican's judicial system. The motu proprio, titled Law CCCLI, updates the laws governing the Vatican's judiciary system and replaced the previous judicial system which was founded in 1987. It provided a head for the Office of the Promoter of Justice (prosecutor's office), and sets out a standardized procedure for possible disciplinary action against certified advocates.

=== Sole judge and tribunal levels ===
The sole judge has to be a Vatican citizen and he can simultaneously serve as a member of the tribunal. The tribunal itself consists of a president and three other judges (however, cases are heard in a curia of three judges). A promoter of justice (Promotore di Giustizia) serves as attorney both at the tribunal and at the court of the sole judge. The members of the tribunal, the sole judge and the promoter of justice are all lay jurists and are appointed by the pope. Former members have been for example sole judge Piero Antonio Bonnet or president of the tribunal Giuseppe dalla Torre, who sat in cases concerning the Vatican leaks scandal in 2012 and 2016 respectively.

On May 7, 2015, Pope Francis appointed as a Judge of the Ecclesiastical Court of Vatican City State, Lucio Banerjee, a cleric of the Diocese of Treviso, in Treviso, Italy, and Paolo Scevola, of the Diocese of Vigevano, to serve as Notary Actuary of the same court; they are officials of the General Affairs Section of the Secretariat of State of the Holy See. On September 30, 2017, Pope Francis named Denis Baudot, an official of the Apostolic Signatura and a priest of the Archdiocese of Lyon in Lyon, France, Judicial Vicar of the Ecclesiastical Tribunal of Vatican City State.

=== Court of appeal ===
The Court of Appeal consists of the president and three other judges (similar to the tribunal, cases are heard in a curia of three judges). The members of the Court of Appeal are appointed by the pope for a term of five years and are both clerics and lay persons. The Promoter of Justice of the Court of Appeals of Vatican City is currently, since his appointment by Pope Francis on Wednesday, June 12, 2013, Professor Raffaele Coppola, Professor of the Law Faculty at the State University of Bari in Bari, Italy, and a member of the Bar for canon and civil law in the Holy See.

=== Court of cassation ===
The Court of Cassation is the supreme court of Vatican City. Until 2023, the court consisted of three judges: a president, who was ex officio the head of the Apostolic Signatura (the church's supreme canonical court), and two other cardinals (appointed by the president) who were also members of the Signatura. In April 2023, however, Pope Francis changed the law to reserve the appointment of judges to the pope. As a result of the change, Cardinal Dominique Mamberti, the prefect of the signatura, was removed as president of the Court of Cassation. Francis appointed several cardinals without expertise in canon or civil law to the court, and appointed Cardinal Kevin Farrell, the camerlengo, as the court's president.

In addition to the cardinal judges, lay legal scholars may be appointed as associate judges to the court.

Before 2021, cardinals and bishops had the special privilege of being tried only before the court of cassation, without first going through the lower courts. However, in 2021, shortly before the indictment of Cardinal Angelo Becciu for financial crimes, Francis abolished the privilege, amending the Vatican's civil code to make the lower court competent to judge cases, except for civil cases, "involving the Most Eminent Cardinals and the Most Excellent Bishops" with the prior approval of the pope.

== Notable trials ==
On 14 October 2020, the first ever in-person criminal sex abuse trial held within the Vatican City walls, and also prosecuted by the Vatican city state itself, began, and involved a priest accused of sexually abusing a former St. Pius X youth seminary student between 2007 and 2012 and another for aiding and abetting the abuse. The accused abuser, Rev. Gabriele Martinelli, 28, was a seminarian and has since become a priest. The other defendant is the seminary's 72-year-old former rector Rev. Enrico Radice, who was charged with aiding and abetting the alleged abuse. On 6 October 2021, a Vatican court acquitted both Martinelli and Radice.

== Incarceration ==
The Vatican Gendarmerie has a limited number of prison cells. Convicted criminals are held in Italian prisons under the terms of the Lateran Treaty.

== See also ==
- Crime in Vatican City
- Federico Cammeo
- Index of Vatican City-related articles
