= David Fanning (journalist) =

South African journalist

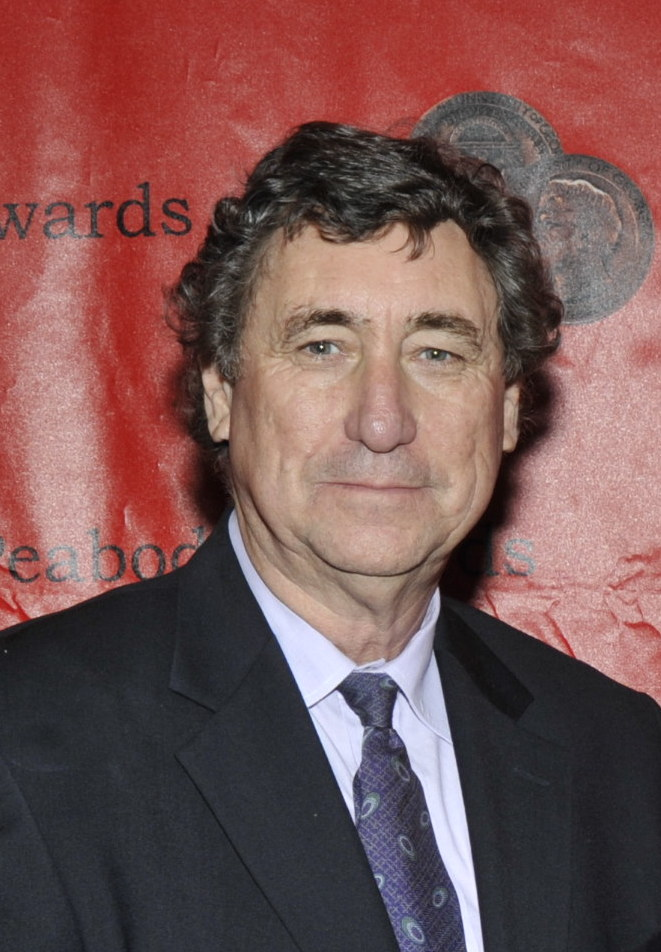
- Fanning at the 70th Annual Peabody Awards, May 23, 2011
- Born: 25 May 1946 (age 80)
- Education: University of Cape Town
- Occupation: Filmmaker
- Title: Executive producer, Frontline 1983–2015 now at large
- Spouse: Renata Simone

David E. Fanning (born 25 May 1946) is a South African American journalist and filmmaker. He was the executive producer of the investigative documentary series Frontline since its first season in 1983 to his retirement in 2015. He has won eight Emmy Awards and in 2013 received a Lifetime Achievement Emmy in honor of his work.

== Career ==
He began his filmmaking career as a young journalist in South Africa. His first films, Amabandla AmaAfrika, directed alongside BBC Journalist, Francois Marais (1970) and The Church and Apartheid (1972), produced for BBC-TV, dealt with race and religion in his troubled homeland. He came to the U.S. in 1973 and began producing and directing local and national documentaries for KOCE, a public television station in California. His film 'Deep South, Deep North' (1973) was a PBS/BBC co-production and the first in a long succession of collaborations between U.S. and European television, especially the British. In 1977, Fanning came to WGBH Boston to start the international documentary series WORLD. As executive producer, he produced and presented over 50 films for PBS in five years. With director Antony Thomas, Fanning produced and co-wrote Death of a Princess (1980). Then in 1982, again with Thomas, he produced Frank Terpil: Confessions of a Dangerous Man, which won the Emmy Award for best investigative documentary.

In 1982, Fanning began the development of Frontline. The series has had over 200 producers and as many journalists, covering a wide range of domestic and foreign stories.

In 2015, Fanning retired as executive producer of Frontline after 33 seasons. He's now at large and the current executive producer is Raney Aronson-Rath.

== Awards and honors ==
In 2004, Fanning received the Columbia Journalism Award, the highest honor awarded by the faculty of the Columbia University Graduate School of Journalism, recognizing "Singular journalistic performance in the public interest... David Fanning and his signature program, Frontline, have turned a commitment to probing journalism and public service into an enduring national conversation, without which far too many important issues would remain veiled or hidden altogether." In 2010, Fanning was honored by the Corporation for Public Broadcasting with the Ralph Lowell Award, public television's most prestigious award, recognizing "outstanding contributions" to the field. That same year Fanning was also honored with the Goldsmith Career Award for Excellence in Journalism by the Shorenstein Center at the Harvard Kennedy School.

In 2013, on Frontline's 30th anniversary, Fanning received a Lifetime Achievement Emmy Award.

In 2022, he received a Peabody Award for his work as an executive producer for the documentary The Power of Big Oil.
