= Secrets of the Vatican =

American television documentary film

- Genre: Documentary film; Television news magazine
- Directed by: Antony Thomas
- Starring: Pope Benedict XVI; Pope Francis; Legion of Christ; Rev. Marcial Maciel Degollado; Juan Vaca; Pope John Paul II; Fr. Thomas Doyle; Monica Barrett; Jeff Anderson (lawyer); Peter Isley; Fr. Gayle Leifeld; Bishop Richard J. Sklba; Nello Rossi; Gianluigi Nuzzi; Cardinal Tarcisio Bertone; Ettore Gotti Tedeschi; Paolo Gabriele
- Narrated by: Will Lyman
- Composer: Sam Watts
- Country of origin: United States
- Original language: English

Production
- Executive producer: Eamonn Matthews
- Producer: Antony Thomas
- Production locations: United States; Rome, Italy
- Editors: McDonald Brown; Christopher Swayne
- Camera setup: Jonathan Partridge, Jonathan Young, Mark Brewer
- Running time: 85 minutes

Original release
- Network: PBS
- Release: February 25, 2014

Secrets of the Vatican is an American television documentary film. It first aired on the PBS Channel on February 25, 2014 as an episode of PBS' Frontline TV series.

The film covers the period after the death of John Paul II until the first year of Pope Francis, and it posits a theory of what made Pope Benedict XVI resign from the papacy in 2013. It presents a return of trust in the Vatican and its new Pope, Francis, by millions of Roman Catholics after a long period of controversy regarding sexual abuse by Church authorities. It delves into reports of the existence of a "gay mafia" inside the Church and highlights the scandal involving the Legionnaires of Christ founder Marcial Maciel, who allegedly had the backing of John Paul II.

The film also tackles the papacy's struggles with cleaning up the Vatican Bank of its corrupt financial policies as an international institution by starting with Benedict XVI's hindered investigations and ending in Francis' supposedly radical initial reforms.

The film approaches the controversial topics of the documentary not from perspectives outside of the Church but with testimonies by devoted Catholics: sexual abuse victims, corruption witnesses and priest investigators.

Written, directed, and produced by Antony Thomas for the US Public Broadcasting System TV series Frontline, Secrets of the Vatican was co-produced by Jason Berry in the United States and Helen Fitzwilliam in Rome.

== Cast ==
In order of appearance:

- Cardinal Cormac Murphy-O'Connor, Archbishop Emeritus of Westminster
- Pope Francis
- Robert Mickens, Vatican correspondent for The Tablet
- Pope Benedict XVI
- Carmelo Abbate, investigative journalist and author of Sex and the Vatican
- members of the Legionnaires of Christ
- Rev. Marcial Maciel Degollado, founder of the Legionnaires of Christ and revealed to have sexually abused boys
- Jason Berry, author of Render Unto Rome and Frontline consultant
- Fr. Juan Vaca, clergy sexual abuse survivor
- Pope John Paul II
- Raul Gonzales, one of Maciel's alleged sons
- Marco Politi, La Repubblica journalist and author of Crisis of a Papacy
- Fr. Thomas Doyle, former secretary and canon lawyer at the Vatican embassy in Washington, D.C., turned campaigner against sexual abuse in the Church and against clericalism
- Milwaukee clergy sexual abuse victims
- Fr. James Connell of Milwaukee
- Monica Barrett, Milwaukee clergy sexual assault and rape victim
- Fr. William Effinger (black and white still photo), Barrett's rapist
- Jeff Anderson, Milwaukee plaintiffs' attorney
- Peter Isley, Milwaukee clergy sexual abuse survivor
- Fr. Gayle Leifeld, confessed sexual abuser
- members of the Milwaukee Survivors Network of those Abused by Priests (SNAP)
- Bishop Richard J. Sklba, auxiliary bishop of the Roman Catholic Diocese of Milwaukee
- Martin Kafka, psychiatrist from the Harvard Medical School invited to the Vatican
- Seminarians at the American seminary in Rome
- Fr. Simone Alfieri, newly-ordained priest who soon left the priesthood
- Francesco Cacace, gay former seminarian
- Cardinal Tarcisio Bertone, appointed by Pope Benedict XVI to be Cardinal Secretary of State
- Members of the Roman Curia
- Nello Rossi, Chief Prosecutor of Rome
- Ettore Gotti Tedeschi, appointed by Pope Benedict XVI to become President of the Vatican Bank to start reforms in the bank, but who was soon expelled by Bertone
- Gianluigi Nuzzi, Milan-television journalist and author of Vatican Ltd.
- Franca Giansoldati, Vatican correspondent of il Messaggero
- Paolo Gabriele
- Msgr. Carlo Maria Viganò (still photo), who, after his 2009 appointment as Secretary General of the Vatican City Governatorate, told Pope Benedict XVI of the extent of the systemic corruption in the Vatican, but was soon transferred by the Pope to the Vatican embassy in the US
- Cardinal Julián Herranz Casado, appointed to head an investigation of the "Vatileaks"
- Barbie Nadeau of CNN and The Daily Beast
- Philip Pullella, Vatican correspondent of Reuters
- Ignazio Ingrao, investigative journalist and author of The Second Secret
- Cardinal Óscar Andrés Rodríguez Maradiaga, archbishop of Tegucigalpa
- members of the new Pope Francis-appointed Council of Cardinal Advisers
- Eugenio Scalfari, renowned atheist
- Fabrizio Mastrofini, editor of Vatican Radio
- Msgr. Nunzio Scarano (blurred out), arrested Vatican Bank officer
- Sandro Magister, Vatican correspondent of L'Espresso

== See also ==
- Vatican leaks scandal
