= His Holiness: The Secret Papers of Benedict XVI =

2012 book by Gianluigi Nuzzi

- Author: Gianluigi Nuzzi
- Original title: Sua Santità. Le carte segrete di Benedetto XVI
- Language: Italian
- Publisher: Chiarelettere
- Publication date: 2012
- Pages: 326
- ISBN: 978-8861900950

His Holiness: The Secret Papers of Benedict XVI (Italian: Sua Santità. Le carte segrete di Benedetto XVI) is a book published by the Italian journalist Gianluigi Nuzzi of confidential letters and memos between Pope Benedict XVI and his personal secretary. The letters in the book portray the Vatican as a corrupt hotbed of jealousy, intrigue and underhanded factional fighting.

The Italian edition paperbook was translated in 2013 in English as Ratzinger Was Afraid.

== Content ==
Nuzzi's book reveals details about the Pope's personal finances and includes tales of bribes made to procure an audience with him. It reproduces confidential letters and memos to and from Benedict and his personal secretary and contains letters from a very senior Vatican administrator to Pope Benedict begging not to be transferred for having exposed alleged corruption that cost the Holy See millions of euros in higher contract prices. The documents also cover a 2009 scandal concerning the ex-editor of the newspaper of the Italian bishops' conference, a dinner between Benedict and Italy's president, and a 2011 letter from an Italian talk show host to the pope enclosing a cheque for 10,000 euros for his charity work and asking for a private audience in exchange.

Diplomatic cables include Vatican embassies from Jerusalem to Cameroon as well as conclusions of the pope's inquiry into the disgraced Legion of Christ religious order in which he is warned that the financial situation of the order, beset by a scandal over its paedophile founder, "while not grave, is serious and pressing".

The documents portray the Vatican Secretary of State, Cardinal Tarcisio Bertone, in a particularly negative light.

The index of this book:

1. The secret visit – Benedict XVI's desk
2. Code name: Source Mary - Inside Benedict XVI's chambers – The opening of the Vatican doors – Meeting the source – Dramatic consequences
3. The Dino Boffo case - Get Boffo: A Vatican smear campaign – Boffo tells the pope: "Holy Father, here are the culprits" - The gay slurs against Boffo – The pope wants to know – Boffo tells Bagnasco: “It's a huge scam”
4. Corruption in the Sacred Palaces - Bertone dismisses the Vatican's clean-up man - 500,000 euros for a nativity scene – The plot against reform - Simeon the conspirer: Godson of Bertone, Geronzi and Bisignani – Last appeal to Ratzinger – Cardinals and the pope's housekeeper come to Viganò defence – The Vatican's stonewall response – US dioceses are bankrupt
5. The church offerings machine - Payments crisis at the Holy See – The man from RAI offers 10,000 euros and asks for an audience – A truffle donation – The pope's bank account – The IOR's disgrace
6. The Vatican's reach on Italian affairs - Tremonti, Bertone, and the real estate tax – The Ruby affair and the Pope – The secret dinner with the Italian President – Berlusconi's man tries to put in a good word, Popemobiles and spooks
7. Vatican spooks - Following people around Rome – Benedict XVI gets advice on the Emanuela Orlandi case - .22 bore bullets – Napoleon in the Vatican – The Secretariat of State gets snubbed – Vatican infighting over a flag
8. Tarcisio Bertone: Ambition at play - “Holy Father, confusion reigns in the heart of the Church” - There's an encyclical to write but Bertone is distracted - “Bertone must go” - The battle to control the Cattolica's finances – A papal hospital? - Corrado Passera gets involved in the San Raffaele affair – Father Georg gets a secret dossier – Jesuits, the Black Pope and the power of money
9. Communion and Liberation, the Legionaries of Christ, and the Lefebvrists - Communion and Liberation acts against the leftist Curia in Milan – The pope at the Meeting of Communion and Liberation for the first time in 30 years – The secrets of the founder of the Legion of Christ – The secret report to Benedict XVI on the Legionaries – Excommunication lifted on the Lefebvre bishops – Benedict XVI at odds with Merkel – Germany Mon Amour – Female priesthood
10. Benedict XVI's geopolitics - Money flows to the non-Catholic East - “Italy risks default, Ratzinger should intervene” - “China is at war with us” - No Catholic breakthrough in Japan
11. Vatican diplomacy - ETA terrorists ask for the Vatican's help – Murder in an Ecuadorean monastery – The mysterious dismissal of the Syrian Monsignor – Bertone and the Swedish journalists - "Poland is worse than Cuban and Sudan" - No prize for the pro-gay marriage US governor – The Iranian Ayatollah wants a papal audience

Inside documents and papers: Secret files of the Pope

== Reception ==
Canada.com called it a "controversial new book that portrays the Vatican as a hotbed of jealousy, intrigue and underhanded factional fighting". When the book was first published, the Vatican called it "criminal" and vowed to take legal action against the author, publisher, and whoever leaked the documents.

== Leaked information ==
Paolo Gabriele, Pope Benedict's personal butler from 2006 to 2012, is believed to have leaked the stolen information to the author. He was held by Vatican police, who claim to have found classified documents in his apartment. He was pardoned by Pope Benedict and told investigators he acted because he saw "evil and corruption everywhere in the church".

== See also ==
- Vatican leaks scandal
