= Frank Donner =

Frank Donner may refer to:

- Frank Donner (lawyer)
- Frank Donner (film producer)
