= Tad Jones =

Tad Jones may refer to:

- Tad Jones (music historian)
- Tad Jones (American football)
- Tad Jones (politician)

== See also ==
- Thad Jones, American jazz trumpeter, composer and bandleader
