= Jason Berry =

American historian

- Born: February 20, 1949 (age 77); New Orleans, Louisiana
- Education: Jesuit High School
- Alma mater: Georgetown University
- Occupations: Writer, journalist, film director
- Website: jasonberryauthor.com

Jason Berry (born February 20, 1949) is an American investigative journalist, author, and filmmaker. He is known for his groundbreaking reporting on the child sexual abuse crisis in the priesthood of the Catholic Church, and as a cultural critic and New Orleans historian.

A native of New Orleans, Berry graduated from Jesuit High School in 1967 and from Georgetown University, cum laude, in 1971.

== Early career ==
A week after college graduation, Berry went to Mississippi, and began work as campaign press secretary to Charles Evers, the mayor of Fayette and first African-American to run for governor of that state. Evers was the brother of the civil rights leader, Medgar Evers, who was assassinated in 1963. Berry captured the experiences in his first book, Amazing Grace: with Charles Evers in Mississippi (1973).

During the 1970s and 1980s, Berry worked as a freelance journalist in New Orleans, covering politics, music, and culture. In 1974, he uncovered a pattern of the IRS targeting Black leaders in Mississippi for tax audits. His reporting on these abuses appeared in two Mississippi dailies, The Nation, Washington Star, and The New York Times (op-ed). His investigative work also revealed environmental pollution in Louisiana which included ties between Governor Edwin Edwards and illegal oil waste dumping.

From 1989-1991, Berry probed Louisiana legislator David Duke's neo-Nazi ties in articles for The New York Times, Washington Post, Los Angeles Times, The Nation, and other publications. He produced and reported David Duke and Holocaust Denial. He also contributed as a reporter on the 1992 Frontline documentary, “Who is David Duke?”

During these years, Berry wrote on music and culture for New Orleans publications and national outlets. He regularly contributed book reviews to The Washington Post, The New Republic, The New York Times and others. With folklorist Jonathan Foose, Berry produced a documentary, Up From the Cradle of Jazz for Louisiana Public Broadcasting. The research for the video led to the 1986 publication (with Foose and researcher Tad Jones) of Up From the Cradle of Jazz: New Orleans Music since World War II. The book has been hailed as “the definitive history of New Orleans music…of the last 50 years.”

In 1982, Berry began a sixteen-month residency in Paris with Journalists in Europe, a program of seminars and research assignments for twenty-nine participants from seventeen countries. During this time, he wrote for The International Herald Tribune, Passion the Magazine of Paris, and Reader’s Digest while also undertaking reporting assignments in London, the Netherlands, and West Africa. In 1983, gave lectures with screenings of Up from the Cradle of Jazz in the U.S. Information Service cultural centers in Nigeria, Cameroon, Benin and Togo. For the New York Times Magazine, he profiled Nigerian playwright Wole Soyinka, who later won the Nobel Prize for Literature.

== Investigating the Church ==
Berry achieved national prominence as the first journalist to uncover the sexual abuse scandal in the Catholic Church in articles from Lafayette, Louisiana, for National Catholic Reporter and The Times of Acadiana. His groundbreaking book, Lead Us Not into Temptation (1992), gained widespread media attention and became a foundational work on the subject. Reviewing the book for USA Today, Phyllis Theroux described Berry as “that rare investigative reporter whose scholarship, compassion, and the ability to write with the poetic power of Robert Penn Warren are in perfect balance.”

Berry made frequent appearances on news outlets such as ABC Nightline, ABC World News Tonight, NBC Nightly News, CBS Nightly News, CNN; 20/20, A&E Investigative Reports, Oprah, Donahue, Geraldo, National Public Radio, and the BBC. For his pioneering reporting, which preceded the Boston Globe’s 2002 Spotlight series, director Ben Proudfoot profiled Berry in a 2021 New York Times Op-Doc, “The First Report.”

His next book on church corruption, Vows of Silence (2004), with co-author Gerald Renner, exposing Pope John Paul II's defense of longtime predator Father Macial Maciel Degollado. In 2006, Pope Benedict removed Maciel from the priesthood. Berry produced a 2008 documentary based on the book which had air dates in Spain, Italy, Ireland and was excerpted in several American films.

In 2011, he published Render Unto Rome: The Secret Life of Money in the Catholic Church, which explored the links between the abuse crisis, the Vatican and church financial scandals. It received the Best Book Award from Investigative Reporters and Editors. The two Vatican books have been widely translated. After Render unto Rome, he was profiled in The Washington Post which focused on his continuing faith despite his investigations.

Berry served as an ABC News consultant in Rome during the 2013 Papal Conclave that elected Pope Francis. He was interviewed by ABC, BBC television and radio, and American radio outlets. He also contributed articles to GlobalPost and National Catholic Reporter. In 2014, he was co-producer and interviewed for Antony Thomas’ PBS Frontline film, Secrets of the Vatican. He was also an interviewee in Alex Gibney, Mea Maxima Culpa: Silence in the House of God, HBO.

== Cultural writing ==
Alongside his investigative work, Berry has written extensively on the history and cultural dynamics of New Orleans and Louisiana. His 2002 stage play Earl Long in Purgatory, won a Big Easy Award for Best Original Work of Drama. In 2006, Berry published Last of the Red Poppas, a comic novel focused on the murder of a morally compromised Cajun governor.

In 2018, he published City of a Million Dreams: A History of New Orleans at Year 300. Larry Blumenthal, writing in the Wall Street Journal praised “the brilliant exposition of how ‘an African American culture grew into a life force of dancing, parading and music to resist a city of laws, anchored in white supremacy’.”

In 2021, Berry released a companion film documentary of the same title that uses jazz funerals as the narrative thread. The film has had many festival and outreach screenings.

Berry has been a contributing writer to the New York Times, the Washington Post, the Chicago Tribune, the Boston Globe, Rolling Stone, The Los Angeles Times, The Dallas Morning News, The Daily Beast, International Herald Tribune, the National Catholic Reporter, The Guardian and others. He has served as a commentator on ABC, National Public Radio, and others and is frequently interviewed by the national media in the United States and abroad.

== Grants and fellowships ==
Berry’s work has been supported by grants from many sources, including the Fund for Investigative Journalism. He received National Endowment for the Humanities and John Simon Guggenheim Memorial Foundation fellowships for his research on City of a Million Dreams. Ford Foundation grants supported the early film work on the documentary. He received a 1992 Alicia Patterson Journalism Fellowship for his reporting on demagoguery in Louisiana. In 2007, he was a visiting distinguished writer-in-residence at Tulane University. In 2024, he held The Kirby Mewshaw Affiliated Fellowship at Civitella Ranieri in Umbria, Italy.

== Awards ==
Berry has received numerous awards recognizing his work. These include:

- Religious Public Relations Society Wilber award and Catholic Press Association Book Award, 1993 for Lead Us Not into Temptation.
- Louisiana Endowment for the Humanities, 2002 Humanist of the Year.
- Best Television Documentary, Vows of Silence [El Legionario de Cristo, in Spanish] Docs D.F. International Film Festival of Mexico City, 2008.
- Moses Berkman Memorial Journalism Award, Trinity College Program on Public Values, Hartford, Connecticut. 2010.
- Sigma Delta Chi, National Society of Journalists, First Place, Foreign Correspondence for Non-Daily Newspaper, “Money and Influence Peddling at the Vatican,” National Catholic Reporter. September 2011 for series in March 2010..
- Investigative Reporters and Editors, Best Book 2011 for Render unto Rome.
- Casey Medal for Meritorious Journalism, 2011, for “Money and Influence Peddling at the Vatican,” National Catholic Reporter series.
- Catholic Press Association, 2011, First Place, Best Investigative News Writing; National Catholic Reporter series on Maciel.
- SNAP [Survivors Network of those Abused by Priests] Pioneer Award 2014.
- ChildUSA, Sean P McMail Hero Award 2022, for reporting on the Church.

== Books ==
- Conversations with Jason Berry (University Press of Mississippi, February 2026) Edited with an introduction by Howard Hunter. ISBN 9781496861177.
- City of a Million Dreams: A History of New Orleans at Year 300 (University of North Carolina Press, 2018). ISBN 9781469647142, OCLC 1029441309.
- Render Unto Rome: The Secret Life of Money in the Catholic Church (Crown, 2011) Published in UK, Italian, Spanish & Russian editions. ISBN 9780385531344, OCLC 693560837.
- Earl Long in Purgatory: A Play and Historical Essay (University of Louisiana at Lafayette Press, 2011). ISBN 978-1935754053.
- Last of the Red Hot Poppas (Chin Music Press, 2006) - Novel; Chinese edition (2013). ISBN 9780974199528, OCLC 71836647.
- Vows of Silence: The Abuse of Power in the Papacy of John Paul II (Free Press, 2004) - With Gerald Renner; Spanish, Italian & Polish editions. ISBN 9780743244411, OCLC 53462027.
- Louisiana Faces: Images from a Renaissance (Louisiana State University Press, 2000) - Text accompanying Philip Gould's photographs. ISBN 978-0807126462 OCLC 43936655.
- The Spirit of Black Hawk: A Mystery of Africans and Indians (University Press of Mississippi, 1995). ISBN 978-0878058068, OCLC 32625527.
- Lead Us Not into Temptation: Catholic Priests and the Sexual Abuse of Children (Doubleday, 1992; multiple editions through 2000). ISBN 978-0-252-06812-6, OCLC 42882938.
- Up From the Cradle of Jazz: New Orleans Music Since World War II (University of Georgia Press, 1986. DaCapo 1992. University of Louisiana at Lafayette Press, 2009) - With Jonathan Foose and Tad Jones (expanded 1986 edition). ISBN 9780820308548, OCLC 906469394.
- Amazing Grace: With Charles Evers in Mississippi (Saturday Review Press, 1973; Legacy paperback 1978). ISBN 0841502609.

== Filmography ==
- City of a Million Dreams (2021) - Festival documentary based on book, exploring New Orleans through jazz funerals. Louisiana Public Broadcasting, August 2025.
- Secrets of the Vatican (PBS Frontline, 2014) - Co-producer and interviewee.
- Vows of Silence (2008) - Producer/director/narrator; international broadcasts in Spain, Ireland and Italy.
- When Saints Go Marching In (1998) - 9-minute film on jazz funerals (excerpted on PBS, 2004)
- Who Is David Duke? (PBS Frontline, 1992) - Treatment writer and off-air reporter
- Up From the Cradle of Jazz (WYES/LPB, 1980) - 1-hour documentary co-produced with Jonathan Foose.
