= James Cavanagh =

James Cavanagh or Cavanaugh may refer to:

- James M. Cavanaugh (1823–1879), U.S. Representative from Minnesota
- James Cavanagh (soldier) (1831–1901), Irish-American brigadier general
- James Cavanagh (baseball) (1850–1890), American baseball player
- James Cavanagh (architect) (1874–1957), Australian architect
- James Cavanaugh (songwriter) (1892–1967), American songwriter of the 1940s, the co-writer of the popular jazz tune, "Mississippi Mud"
- Jim Cavanagh (1913–1990), Australian politician
- James P. Cavanagh (1922–1971), American screenwriter of Playhouse 90 and Murder at the Gallop
- James Ronald Kavanagh a.k.a. Ronnie Kavanagh (1931–2021), Irish rugby union player

== See also ==
- James Kavanagh (disambiguation)
- James Kavanaugh (1928–2009), author of A Modern Priest Looks at His Outdated Church
