= Disappearance of Emanuela Orlandi =

Vatican teenager missing since 1983

Emanuela Orlandi
- Born: 14 January 1968; Rome, Italy
- Disappeared: 22 June 1983 (aged 15); Rome, Italy
- Status: Missing for 43 years, 4 months and 30 days
- Height: 160 cm (5 ft 3 in)
- Parents: Ercole Orlandi (father); Maria Pezzano (mother)
- Family: Pietro Orlandi (brother); Natalina Orlandi (sister); Federica Orlandi (sister); Maria Cristina Orlandi (sister)

Emanuela Orlandi (born 14 January 1968) was a Vatican teenager who mysteriously disappeared while returning home from music school in Rome on 22 June 1983. The case received worldwide attention due to the public appeal of Pope John Paul II for her release after an unnamed terrorist organisation claimed to be holding the girl in exchange for the liberation of Mehmet Ali Ağca, the Turkish terrorist who had attempted to assassinate the Pope two years prior. However, the subsequent investigation discovered that the allegation of international terrorism was a misdirection, and the real motive of the disappearance remains unknown.

The case was the subject of two judicial investigations, the first between 1983 and 1997, the second between 2008 and 2015, both closed without finding a solution. The case was opened again in 2023 by the Vatican magistrates, by the Rome Prosecutor's Office, and by a bicameral parliamentary commission, thus being the subject of three investigations simultaneously.

Over the course of four decades, the case has led to much speculation about the involvement of international terrorism, organized crime, the role of a possible serial killer, a possible familiar trail, and a plot inside the Holy See to cover up a sex scandal involving ecclesiastical figures. Orlandi's family, in particular her brother Pietro, have consistently pressed the Vatican for the release of information about the case, believing that the Holy See knew more than it admitted. The Vatican has always maintained strict silence about the matter, denying any accusation of involvement.

== Early life ==
Emanuela Orlandi was the fourth of five children of Ercole Orlandi (died 2004) and Maria Pezzano. Her father was a lay employee in the papal household. The family lived inside Vatican City and, according to her older brother Pietro, the children had the free run of the Vatican Gardens.

Orlandi was in her second year of secondary school in Rome. Although the school year had concluded, she continued to take flute lessons three times per week at the Scuola di Musica Tommaso Ludovico da Victoria, connected with the Pontifical Institute of Sacred Music. She was also part of the church choir at the Sant'Anna dei Palafrenieri in the Vatican.

== Chronology ==
=== Disappearance ===
Orlandi usually travelled by bus to the music school, located in Piazza di Sant'Apollinare, next to Piazza Navona. She would get off after a few stops and walk the last few hundred metres. Upon leaving home around 4:00 p.m. on 22 June 1983, Orlandi was late to class and the weather was extremely hot. She asked Pietro to drive her to school, but he had other commitments. "I've gone over it so many times, telling myself if only I had accompanied her maybe it wouldn't have happened," he recalled decades later.

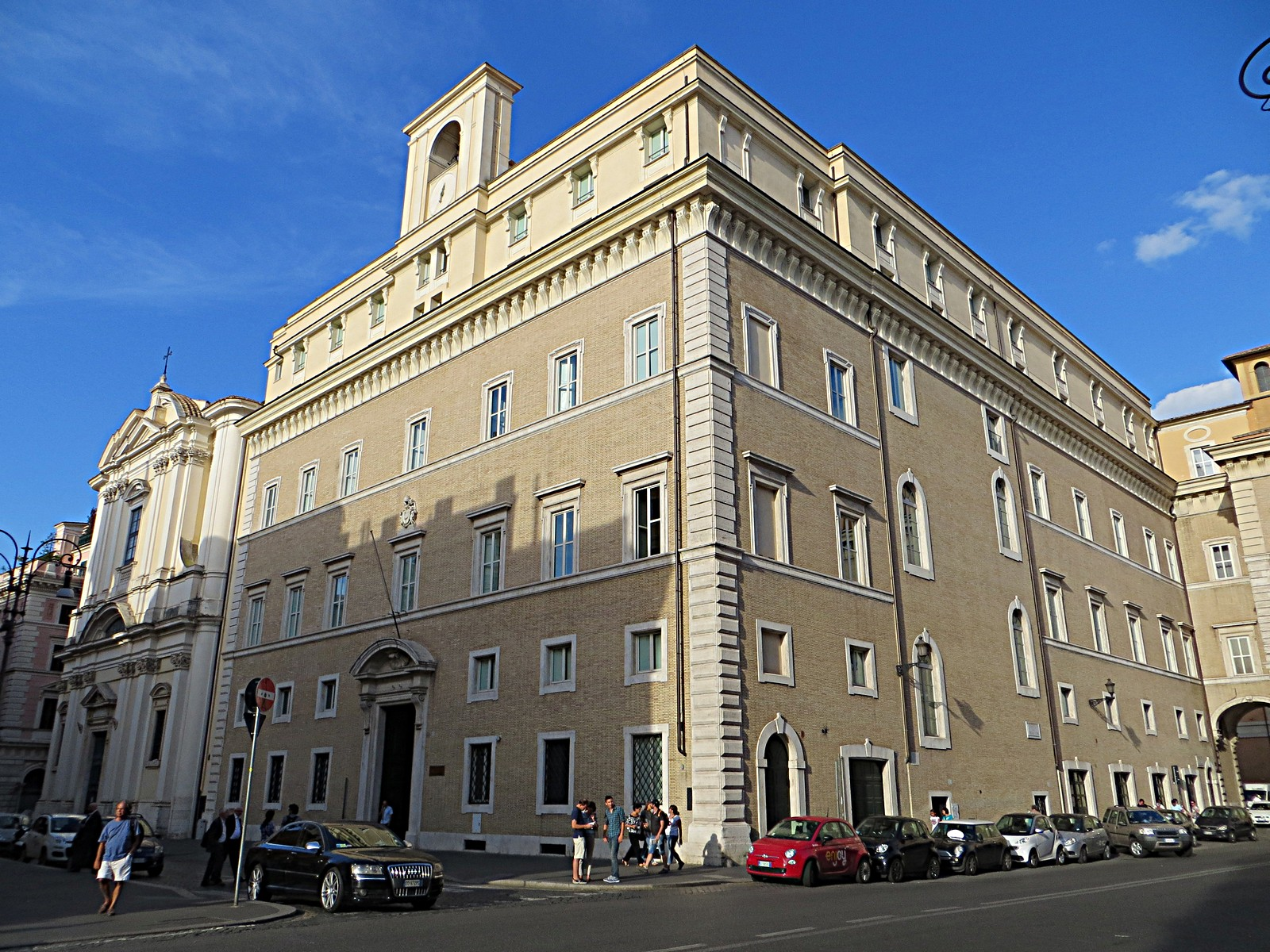
The palace of Sant'Apollinare with the annexed basilica. This was the location of the music school attended by Orlandi before her disappearance.

At the end of class, Orlandi phoned home and explained to her sister Federica that before the lesson, she had received a job offer from a representative of Avon Products to hand out flyers at a fashion show for two hours, adding that she would meet him again at the end of the lesson to give him an answer. Federica told her not to accept the offer, believing the compensation to be excessive and thus unreliable, and suggested discussing the matter with their parents first. While leaving school, Orlandi spoke of the job offer with two female classmates, who then left her at a bus stop in Corso Rinascimento, in front of Palazzo Madama. She was last seen around 7:30 p.m. at the bus stop, in the company of another girl, who was never identified.

Later that night, after hours of waiting, Orlandi's family began to worry and started looking for her in an area between the Vatican and the music school. They called the director of the music school to ask if any of their daughter's classmates had any information about her. Her father then went to the police to report her missing, but the police assumed she was with friends and suggested waiting. Orlandi was officially declared missing the next morning. Over the next two days, announcements of her disappearance were published in the Italian newspapers Il Tempo, Paese Sera, and Il Messaggero.

=== Subsequent events ===
In the first days after the disappearance, Giulio Gangi, a young agent of the SISDE and friend of the Orlandi family, questioned the two police officers who were on duty in front of Palazzo Madama on the evening of the disappearance. Both confirmed they saw a girl fitting Orlandi's description talking to a man who was holding an Avon cosmetics bag, although they disagreed on the time of the sighting. One of the officers placed this event before Orlandi's music lesson, while the other thought it was around 7:00 p.m., after the class had ended. According to the police, the man was driving a dark green BMW. Gangi managed to track down the car, which was being repaired by a mechanic, as one of its windows had been broken from the inside. Gangi discovered that the car belonged to a woman, but before he could dig deeper, he was removed from the investigation by superiors.

At 6:00 p.m. on Saturday 25 June, a phone call was received from a youth who claimed to be a sixteen-year-old boy named "Pierluigi". He reported that he and his fiancée had met a girl fitting Orlandi's description in Campo de' Fiori. The young man mentioned her flute, long dark hair, and a pair of glasses that she did not like to wear, along with other details that matched the description. According to "Pierluigi", the girl had just had a haircut and had introduced herself as "Barbarella", stating that she had run away from home and was selling Avon products. The girl's description and the mention of Avon products at a time when that was not yet public knowledge led people to think that "Pierluigi's" tip was genuine. "Pierluigi" called two more times the same day and the day after, providing other information about himself and more details about the girl.

"Pierluigi"'s phone calls drew suspicion not only for the obvious references to Orlandi but also for the mention of one of her friends. "Pierluigi" stated that he was calling from a restaurant in a seaside location. The police learned that that very evening, Pierluigi Magnesio, a friend of Orlandi, was in a restaurant in the seaside town of Ladispoli. This coincidence led investigators to believe that the callers were either aware of Orlandi's group of friends in the Vatican or were instructed by someone inside the Vatican. Agents of the Italian secret service visited Orlandi's house and made an inspection, after which they suggested that the Orlandi family should start recording all phone calls.

On 27 June, a man calling himself "Mario" phoned the family and claimed to own a bar near Ponte Vittorio, between the Vatican and the music school. He reported that he knew a boy and two girls who in those days were selling Avon products. One of them was a young girl from Venice named "Barbara", who had confided to him about being a runaway but said that she would return home for her sister's wedding. This element could fit Orlandi, as her older sister Natalina was going to marry in September. When Orlandi's uncle asked "Mario" the height of the girl he saw, asking if she was around 150 or 160 cm, a second male voice could be heard in the background saying, "No, more". On 30 June, a large number of posters displaying Orlandi's photograph were plastered across Rome.

During the Angelus on 3 July, Pope John Paul II issued an appeal to those responsible for Orlandi's disappearance, making the hypothesis of kidnapping official for the first time. Two days later, the Orlandi family received the first of a number of phone calls made by an anonymous male with an American accent, who would later be called "the American". The man claimed to be calling on behalf of a terrorist organization that was holding Orlandi captive, demanding the release of Mehmet Ali Ağca, the Turkish man who shot the Pope in May 1981, in exchange for the girl's release. As proof, "the American" played a recording of Orlandi's voice over the phone. The anonymous caller also mentioned "Mario" and "Pierluigi" of the previous phone calls, identifying them as "members of the organisation". Despite decades of investigations, the real identity of "the American" has never been discovered.

The next day, on 6 July, "the American" informed the Agenzia Nazionale Stampa Associata (ANSA) news agency of the demand for a prisoner exchange, asking for the Pope's participation within twenty days and indicating that a wastebasket in the public square near the Italian Parliament would contain proof that Orlandi was indeed in his hands. These were to have been photocopies of her music school identity card, a receipt for tuition, and a note handwritten by the kidnapped girl.

On 8 July, a man with an alleged Middle Eastern accent phoned one of Orlandi's classmates, saying the girl was in his hands and that they had twenty days to make the exchange with Ağca. He also asked for a direct telephone line with Cardinal Agostino Casaroli, the Vatican secretary of state. The line was installed on 18 July. A total of sixteen telephone calls were made by "the American" from different public telephones.

On the instructions of the alleged kidnappers, an audio cassette was found near ANSA's offices on 17 July, which appeared to be a recording of a girl being tortured. Police told the family they did not believe the victim to be Orlandi, although her brother has expressed doubts about this. However, former DIGOS agent Antonio Asciore, who first found and listened to the cassette, claimed that the recording given to the family and later published was not the original one he found. He claimed that the original recording was longer than the published recording, and a male voice could be heard in the background. The presence of male voices was also reported in the original transcription of the recording made by police immediately after discovery, giving support to Asciore's claims that the published recording had been manipulated or faked.

On 4 August 1983, ANSA received a written statement from an organization calling itself the Turkish Anti-Christian Turkesh Liberation Front, later simply referred as "Turkesh", who claimed to be holding Orlandi in exchange for Ağca's release. Turkesh sent seven letters in total between August 1983 and November 1985. Although they showed no evidence of Orlandi's captivity, Turkesh was able to provide many precise details about her private life, even mentioning the number of moles on her back. In the first "Turkesh" statement, there was also an ambiguous reference to Mirella Gregori, another 15-year-old girl who had gone missing in Rome forty days before Orlandi. In the following days, both Turkesh and "the American" confirmed that both Orlandi and Gregori were their captives. On the request of the Orlandi and Gregori families, Italian President Sandro Pertini made a public appeal for the girls' release on 20 October 1983, linking the two cases in the public consciousness.

From this moment on, the Italian Secret Services appointed to both the Orlandis and the Gregoris the legal aid of lawyer Gennaro Egidio, who had a long career in international affairs, terrorism, and international crimes, including the death of Jeanette Bishop Rothschild, in order to redirect all phone calls from the alleged kidnappers to his office. In the following months, whenever "the American" called, Egidio attempted to make a deal for the girls' liberation, or at least to secure proof of their condition. However, no such proof was ever obtained. Years later, Egidio stated that the lack of this proof demonstrated that there was no real kidnapping.

In a phone call with Egidio on 27 October 1983, "the American" announced the death of Mirella Gregori, saying they would return her body one week before Christmas, but nothing was ever given. When Egidio asked about Orlandi, "the American" replied he had nothing to say about her for the moment.

On 24 December 1983, six months after the disappearance, Pope John Paul II visited Orlandi's house and told the family that "the case of Emanuela is a case of international terrorism" and assured them that "the Holy See is doing as much as humanly possible to have a positive ending". Years later, Pietro Orlandi commented that "from that moment, instead, the Pope allowed silence to surround Emanuela's case".

Fourteen years later, in 1997, the first investigation of the Orlandi case was dismissed by the public prosecutor of Rome due to a lack of new evidence. In his official statement, the magistrature classified the theory of Orlandi's kidnapping by international terrorists as a misdirection.

In 2013, a few days after his election, Pope Francis met the Orlandi family after a mass and told them that "Emanuela is in heaven", implying the girl's death. According to the family, this statement was proof that the Holy See knew what happened to Orlandi, despite the Vatican claiming over many years that it was not involved in the matter. Pietro asked many times to have a meeting with the Pope in order to ask for more information, but the Vatican never replied.

== Theories ==
=== Orlandi–Ağca connection theory, Turkesh, Stasi, and the KGB ===
In mid-2000, Judge Ferdinando Imposimato, an Italian prosecutor with extensive experience with high-profile investigations, suggested that Orlandi, by then an adult, was living a perfectly integrated life in the Muslim community and had probably lived for a long time in Paris. In a prison interview ten years later, Ağca, who had once declared that Orlandi had been kidnapped by Bulgarian agents of the Grey Wolves, stated that Orlandi was alive and living safely in a cloistered convent in central Europe.

No clues were found about the existence of Turkesh, and neither Italian authorities nor international intelligence agencies believed such an organisation ever existed. However, the detailed information they provided about the girl led Italian investigators to conclude that Turkesh was a fake organization created by the people responsible for her disappearance, with the intent to mislead them. The fact that Turkesh was aware of information known only to Italian authorities led many to think that the kidnappers had links to Italian intelligence agencies.

In 2008, Günter Bohnsack, a former Stasi agent, said that the secret services of East Germany used the Orlandi case to create a false connection between Ağca and the Grey Wolves in order to divert attention from investigations into the theory that Ağca was actually involved with the secret services of Bulgaria as he prepared his attempted assassination of Pope John Paul II. According to Bohnsack, it was the Stasi who sent fake letters to the Vatican, written in Turkish or Italian, in order to make them believe the Grey Wolves were holding the girl captive and wanted Ağca's release. Bohnsack said the order for this operation (called "Operation Papst") came directly from the KGB.

=== Organised crime theory ===
Discovery of Enrico De Pedis grave

On 11 July 2005, an anonymous caller to the Italian television program Chi l'ha visto? said that to resolve the Orlandi case, it was necessary to look who was buried in the crypt of the Basilica di Sant'Apollinare, in Rome. It was discovered that the crypt contained the grave of Enrico De Pedis (1954–1990), leader of the Roman gang Banda della Magliana.

A controversy arose as to why De Pedis, a violent criminal, had been buried in the crypt of a major Roman basilica, a mode of burial normally reserved for high-ranking figures such as cardinals. In fact, a newspaper article from 1997 had reported on this strange burial, provoking protests from the police union, but when neither the Vatican nor Opus Dei (owners of the basilica) felt the need to justify it, the matter was forgotten.

The official reply of the then-director of the Basilica, Don Piero Vergari, a friend of De Pedis, was that the criminal was buried there due to his charity to the poor who attended the basilica as well as his large donations to the establishment itself. In 2012, Vergari was investigated for abduction and later cleared, in 2015, when the second investigation of the Orlandi case was dismissed.

The anonymous caller of 2005 also suggested they investigate "the favour that De Pedis did for Cardinal Poletti", implying this was the reason for his burial at the basilica and the reason behind Orlandi's disappearance. In 2012, the Italian Ministry of Interior confirmed that Poletti, who at the time of De Pedis' burial was serving as president of the Episcopal Conference of Italy and Cardinal Vicar of the Diocese of Rome, had indeed given his approval. Italian police subsequently opened the tomb and took DNA samples. While no clues were found in the tomb linking De Pedis to Orlandi, the controversy prompted speculation that Banda della Magliana was involved in the girl's disappearance.

Testimony of Antonio Mancini and Sabrina Minardi

In February 2006, former Banda della Magliana member Antonio Mancini stated in an interview that he recognized the voice of "Mario", one of the anonymous callers from 1983, as a subordinate of De Pedis named Ruffetto. This testimony was corroborated by Sabrina Minardi, De Pedis' former girlfriend, who claimed that Orlandi was kidnapped by Banda della Magliana on the orders of Archbishop Paul Marcinkus (1922–2006), the disgraced former head of the Institute for the Works of Religion (Vatican Bank), as part of a "power game". Minardi also claimed to have held a drugged Orlandi captive in her apartment in Torvaianica for several days before moving her to another apartment in Rome. She added that she was instructed by De Pedis to drive the girl to a Vatican petrol station and deliver her to a man dressed as a priest.

Minardi's credibility has often been questioned due to the shifting and sometimes contradictory nature of her story, as well as her history of drug abuse. When her initial testimony was leaked to the press in June 2008, she began changing her story, confusing the sequence of events and claiming the involvement of people who had been dead by 1983. In particular, Minardi changed Orlandi's whereabouts several times, which altogether led Italian authorities to doubt her testimony.

Possible role of Vatican Bank and Banco Ambrosiano

Regarding reasons why Banda della Magliana allegedly kidnapped Orlandi, Mancini suggested in 2011, that it was tied to large money transactions through the Milan-based Banco Ambrosiano, which had been involved in both laundering money on behalf of Banda della Magliana and lending this money to IOR, the Vatican Bank. During those years, the IOR, led by Marcinkus, was using this money to fund the Solidarity movement to fight communist rule in Poland, the pope's homeland. According to Mancini, following Banco Ambrosiano's collapse in 1982, the gang kidnapped Orlandi in order to force the Vatican to pay restitution, although this theory would contradict Minardi's claims that Marcinkus was the instigator of the kidnapping.

=== Vatican sex scandal theory ===
Over decades of investigations, the circumstances of Orlandi's disappearance led many investigators to doubt the abduction hypothesis. First of all, the fact that the girl was last seen in Corso Rinascimento, one of Rome's busiest streets, in full daylight, suggested that it was unrealistic that she would have been taken by force without anyone noticing. Some investigators concluded that it was more realistic to believe that the girl went with someone she knew. Above all, over the course of the following months, the alleged kidnappers were never able to provide any actual proof of her captivity. The only object they provided was a photocopy of her music school membership card, which was available in the music school archives, which fell under Vatican jurisdiction.

In July 1993, cardinal Silvio Oddi made some ambiguous statements about Orlandi. In an interview, he claimed that in the days following the girl's disappearance, he heard a conversation between two Vatican gendarmes who said that they saw Emanuela returning to the Vatican the very evening of her disappearance in a luxury car. Emanuela apparently left the Vatican gates twenty minutes later, getting in the car again and leaving. The two gendarmes were not able to see who the car driver was, but they had the impression he parked a few meters away so as not to be recognized. Oddi was then questioned by judge Adele Rando about this rumour, but he was not able to reveal the identity of the two gendarmes.

Since the early 2000s, Italian journalist Pino Nicotri, who conducted a detailed study of the Orlandi case based on judicial documents, has rejected the kidnapping hypothesis. Nicotri claimed that in 2005, he had come to know from a source inside the Vatican that Orlandi died accidentally the night of her disappearance, during a "convivial meeting" with high-ranking Vatican figures in an apartment in Via Monte del Gallo, near the Vatican. According to Nicotri, Orlandi had been involved in this type of meeting for some time before her disappearance, but on the night of 22 June 1983, she died under unknown circumstances. Nicotri also stated that the theory of kidnapping by international terrorists was contrived to divert attention from the scandal, while the hypothesis of the involvement of Banda della Magliana in the 2000s was made up by the mass media after the anonymous phone call to Chi l'ha visto? and Minardi's false testimony. According to Nicotri's Vatican source, the Italian Secret Services were aware of this.

In May 2012, exorcist Gabriele Amorth claimed that Orlandi was the victim of a group of ecclesiastical paedophiles. According to him, a member of the Vatican police was "recruiting" young girls for sex parties and officials of an unnamed foreign embassy were implicated.

This allegation re-emerged with the 2016 publication of Atto di dolore, a book by Italian journalist Tommaso Nelli, which contained an exclusive testimony from a friend of Orlandi's who claimed that, some months before her disappearance, she had confided that she had been molested by "someone close to the Pope" in the Vatican Gardens on several occasions. An interview with the anonymous woman was mentioned in the Netflix documentary miniseries Vatican Girl: The Disappearance of Emanuela Orlandi, released in October 2022, although in this interview, the woman said that this revelation occurred only one week before the girl's disappearance.

On 14 December 2022, Italian journalist Alessandro Ambrosini published an exclusive recording of Marcello Neroni, a man affiliated with De Pedis and Banda della Magliana, who implied that Orlandi was made to disappear or was kidnapped by De Pedis on the request of someone inside the Vatican for the purposes of covering up a sex scandal. After this, Italian authorities began searching for Neroni in order to question him.

A presumed plot between Banda della Magliana and the Vatican, rather than an operation against the Vatican, had already been mentioned back in 2009 by Maurizio Abbatino, a Banda boss who had turned to aiding the judicial system.

=== Vatileaks and London trail ===
In 2017, Italian journalist Emiliano Fittipaldi came into possession of secret Vatican documents that had been stolen in 2014 in the Vatican leaks scandal. One of these documents, signed 28 March 1997 and sent to Archbishop Giovanni Battista Re and Archbishop Jean-Louis Tauran, allegedly shows that the Vatican spent over 483 million lire (around 250,000 euros) on supporting Orlandi from 1983 until 1997, including expenses for her education and medical care. The document suggested that Orlandi had lived in London under Vatican protection for several years, and that her remains had been sent back to the Vatican following her eventual death. Both the Vatican and Italian authorities regard the documents as false.

This was not the first time the suspicion arose that Orlandi was being hidden in London. On 17 June 2011, during an Italian television program that included Pietro Orlandi, an anonymous caller, who identified himself as a former SISMI agent, claimed that she was still alive and being kept in a mental hospital in London. The caller also claimed that the kidnapping was carried out due to the fact that her father was aware of the money laundering involving the Vatican Bank and Banco Ambrosiano.

In April 2023, Pietro Orlandi revealed that he came into possession of a 1993 letter by the then-Archbishop of Canterbury, George Carey, to Cardinal Poletti. In the letter, Carey mentions Orlandi and suggests a personal meeting with Poletti to talk about the matter. The letter was mailed to 170 Clapham Road, London. At number 176 on the same street is the Scalabrini Fathers' Female Hostel, featured in the 2017 document, where Orlandi allegedly lived under Vatican protection. This letter lent credence to the theory that Emanuela could have been transported to London after being kidnapped. In May 2023, former archbishop Carey rejected the authenticity of the letter.

=== Serial killer theory ===
In the 2000s, Judge Otello Lupacchini and journalist Max Parisi conducted a study of over twelve cases of young girls missing and murdered in Rome between 1982 and 1990 and hypothesized that all of them were victims of a serial killer, due to the similarities of the murders and their proximity within the city. Some of these include the murders of Katy Skerl and Simonetta Cesaroni, two major unsolved crimes in Italy. Lupacchini and Parisi put forth the theory that both Mirella Gregori and Emanuela Orlandi were victims of this serial killer. According to them, this man lured the girls with job offers, like selling Avon products, and then kidnapped and killed them. Gregori and Orlandi, who were the only two minors on this list of victims, were also the only ones whose bodies were never found.

=== Possible role of Marco Accetti ===
In 2013, Marco Accetti, a photographer convicted for the death of Josè Garramon, claimed to be one of the kidnappers of both Orlandi and Mirella Gregori. He stated that this was done as part of an internal blackmail campaign and a feud between rival factions within the Vatican to influence the anti-communist policies of Pope John Paul II. Accetti claimed that he was the one who took Orlandi out of the music school and that he impersonated the callers "Mario" and "the American". He stated that the kidnapping was originally meant to be temporary and the girls were taken with their consent, but in the end, things got worse. Accetti was not able to state the whereabouts of the two girls, as he was arrested in the middle of the operation in December 1983 for the murder of young Josè Garramon. Garramon, a twelve-year-old Uruguayan boy, was run over and killed by Accetti's van on a country road near Castelfusano, 20 km away from his home. The police were not able to explain how the boy got so far from home, unless he had been kidnapped. Accetti always denied having taken the boy, saying he ran over him by accident after the boy came out of nowhere.

As proof of his role in Orlandi's kidnapping, Accetti presented a flute, claiming it was the one she had at the time of her disappearance. Although the Orlandi family believed the flute could be Emanuela's, no DNA was found on the instrument, and one of the girl's music teachers stated that Orlandi's flute was of a different brand. The lack of evidence led the investigators to conclude that Accetti was a narcissist and a pathological liar.

Although Accetti's credibility in the Orlandi case has been questioned, he was able to provide precise details about other cases of missing girls. A telephone analysis confirmed that "the American" who once called the Gregori family was Accetti's voice. In that phone call, "the American" listed the precise dress worn by Mirella Gregori at the time of her disappearance. In 2016, Accetti stated that the grave of Katy Skerl, murdered in 1984, was empty. In 2022, it was shown that Skerl's coffin had been stolen. Accetti had previously stated that Skerl's death was linked to the Orlandi-Gregori cases. According to Accetti, Skerl was killed by the opponent rival faction as revenge for the abduction of Orlandi and Gregori. All these elements, in addition to the strange role of Accetti in Garramon's death, led some observers to consider that Accetti could be the serial killer suggested by Lupacchini and Parisi.

In May 2024, a sound assessment carried out by an expert, Marco Arcuri, on the recordings of the phone call from "Mario" and three calls from "the American", established that Accetti's voice was an 86% match.

== Role of the Vatican ==
=== Investigations of the Vatican City ===
Over the years, questions were raised as to why the Vatican never opened an official investigation into Orlandi's disappearance, even though she was a Vatican citizen. The unofficial reply from the Vatican was that since she had disappeared on Italian territory, it fell under Italian jurisdiction. However, on 12 October 1993, Italian authorities recorded a telephone conversation between Raoul Bonarelli, then-deputy chief of the Gendarmerie of the Vatican City, and Monsignor Bertani, then-Chaplain of His Holiness to Pope John Paul II. The phone call took place on the eve of Bonarelli's questioning by Judge Adele Rando in relation to the Gregori case; Gregori's mother claimed to have recognized Bonarelli as the man she saw in the company of her daughter shortly before her disappearance. In the phone call, Bertani ordered Bonarelli not to say anything to Italian police about the Vatican's investigations into the Orlandi case, suggesting that the Vatican had opened an investigation without informing Italian authorities.

=== Lack of cooperation in investigations ===
On 13 November 1986, judge Ilario Martella presented one international rogatory letter to the Vatican to request cooperation and documents concerning Orlandi, but the rogatory was rejected. On 2 March 1994 and later 7 March 1995, judge Adele Rando presented two other letters rogatory to the Vatican in order to obtain documents concerning Orlandi and to question cardinals Agostino Casaroli, Angelo Sodano, Giovanni Battista Re, Dino Monduzzi, and Eduardo Martínez Somalo. The Vatican rejected both rogatories. When Rando asked for information concerning the phone calls between the Vatican and the alleged kidnappers, the Vatican replied that no calls with "the American" were recorded or transcribed. In the dismissal sentence of December 1997, Rando explicitly mentioned the "lack of cooperation of the Vatican institutions with the Italian magistrates".

=== Negotiations between the Vatican and Giancarlo Capaldo ===
In December 2021, Giancarlo Capaldo, the former public prosecutor of Rome who led the second investigation over the Orlandi case, revealed that in 2012, years after the discovery of De Pedis' grave, secret negotiations were held in the Palace of Justice between him, his deputy Simona Maisto, and two emissaries of the Holy See. The two emissaries were Domenico Giani, the then-inspector general of the Gendarmerie of the Vatican City, and his deputy, Costanzo Alessandrini, who had been sent by the Vatican to ask Capaldo to remove De Pedis' grave from the Basilica of Sant'Apollinare, as it was a "great embarrassment" for the Holy See to have a criminal buried there, especially after an increase in public opposition to this. Capaldo accepted the request in exchange for information on the Orlandi case. Two days later, the emissaries accepted the trade and proposed to give Capaldo documents with the names of people involved in the case. Capaldo replied that alongside these documents, he wanted Emanuela Orlandi herself, dead or alive.

According to Capaldo, two weeks later, the two emissaries said that they were accepting the exchange under the condition that Capaldo would give the Orlandi family and the media a story that would absolve the Vatican of any responsibility. However, this negotiation was not followed by any firm action, which is why, on 2 April 2012, Capaldo made a public statement, saying that the Vatican was aware of the truth about the case and that he was not going to disturb the De Pedis' grave for the moment. The following day, he was removed from his position and replaced by Giuseppe Pignatone, who denied the former's statement and ordered the grave to be removed.

== Other public speculation, activity ==
On the morning of 14 May 2001, the parish priest of the San Gregorio VII church, near the Vatican, discovered a human skull of small dimensions and lacking a jaw in a bag with an image of Padre Pio in a confessional. Although it was not identified as Orlandi's, the discovery generated suspicions that it might be her skull.

On 6 April 2007, in a Good Friday sermon in St. Peter's Basilica, Reverend Raniero Cantalamessa advised the congregation to make amends for sins before dying. He said, "Don't carry your secret to the grave with you!" This provoked speculation that he was suggesting someone at the Vatican held information about Orlandi's disappearance. Vatican spokesperson Rev. Federico Lombardi issued a statement that detailed Vatican cooperation with civil investigators over the years and said the Church had no objection to the opening of the De Pedis tomb, which was then being discussed. The statement read, "As far as we know, there is nothing hidden, nor are there 'secrets' in the Vatican to reveal on the subject. To continue to assert it is completely unjustified; also, we reiterate, yet again, all the material from the Vatican was handed over, in its time, to the investigating magistrates and to police authorities."

In October 2018, remains found during renovation work on the Holy See's embassy to Italy in Rome were the subject of speculation related to the Orlandi affair. An attorney for the Orlandi family objected to the media attention, saying, "We have no idea why the association with Emanuela was made.... We're still asking ourselves why you'd find some bones and immediately assume they were Emanuela's." Test results released on 1 February 2019 showed the remains belonged to a Roman man who died between 190 and 230 AD.

In October 2022, Netflix released a four-part docuseries entitled Vatican Girl: The Disappearance of Emanuela Orlandi. It explored different theories surrounding Orlandi's disappearance, with a focus on those involving the Vatican and organised crime.

=== Reports on the Teutonic cemetery and St. Mary Major ===
In the summer of 2018, the Orlandi family's lawyer received an anonymous letter with a picture of the statue of an angel in the Teutonic Cemetery, inside the Vatican. The letter read, "If you want to find Emanuela, search where the angel looks". On 10 July 2019, it was announced that the Vatican would be opening two tombs inside the Teutonic Cemetery, and they would then be examined by forensic anthropologist Giovanni Arcudi. They were the "Tomb of the Angel", meant to contain the remains of Princess Sophie of Hohenlohe-Waldenburg-Bartenstein, and an adjacent one, which supposedly contained the remains of Duchess Charlotte Frederica of Mecklenburg-Schwerin. The exhumations took place on 11 July 2019. Neither Orlandi's body nor those of the two princesses were found. The Vatican said it would conduct an investigation into the whereabouts of the princesses' remains. However, an empty chamber, encased in reinforced concrete, was found below the level of the two tombs; a technical expert stated that it was built later than the 19th century.

In January 2023, Pietro Orlandi revealed that he and his lawyer were given a screenshot of a 2014 WhatsApp chat between two cardinals "close to Pope Francis" who were talking about the displacement of some unspecified object concerning Emanuela Orlandi. In the chat, the two cardinals mentioned documents concerning Orlandi and the payment of "grave workers". Pietro Orlandi suspected they were referring to the displacement of something inside the empty chamber found in 2019 in the Teutonic Cemetery. He did not publicly reveal the identity of the two cardinals, though he did provide their names to the police and the Vatican investigators. In December 2023, Pietro Orlandi revealed that he was informed that a chest with unspecified contents was given to Cardinal Santos Abril y Castelló, who brought it to the Basilica of St. Mary Major and had it placed in the basilica's crypt.

== 2023 reopening of the case ==
On 9 January 2023, the Vatican opened its first official investigation into Emanuela Orlandi's disappearance. Pope Francis appointed head prosecutor Alessandro Diddi to lead the probe. The Vatican plans to conduct a complete review that will re-examine all files, reports, and testimony. On 11 April, Pietro Orlandi gave his first official testimony to Vatican City head prosecutor Alessandro Diddi. On 15 May, the Italian public prosecutor in Rome opened the third official investigation into the case.

In January, a few days after the opening of the Vatican investigation, the Italian Parliament started a process for the institution of a parliamentary commission to investigate the disappearances of Orlandi and Mirella Gregori. The proposal of the commission was unanimously approved by the Chambers of Deputies on 23 March but encountered difficulties in the Senate in April. On 6 June, Vatican head prosecutor Alessandro Diddi said that the Vatican did not support the institution of an Italian commission, claiming that it would be a "dangerous intrusion" and that the investigation opened by the public prosecutor of Rome was enough. Pietro Orlandi commented on the Senate's reticence, saying that it was unacceptable that in Italian politics, there is still a "psychological subjection towards the Vatican".

On 22 June, the Vatican said it would hand over all the evidence collected to the Rome city prosecutor for review. On 25 June, during his Angelus address, Pope Francis recalled the fortieth anniversary of Orlandi's disappearance, "expressing closeness to the family, above all, the mother", and then extended the prayer to all missing persons. It was the first time since 1983 that a pope publicly mentioned Orlandi. The Orlandi family took the pope's message positively, as another step towards transparency. On 27 June 2023, the parliamentary commission was unanimously approved in the senate.

=== Suspicions on uncle Mario Meneguzzi ===
On 10 July 2023, the Vatican released an "unedited file" to the Italian TV news program TG La7 that suggested a possible involvement of Orlandi's uncle, Mario Meneguzzi, in the disappearance of the girl. The document noted an "impressive resemblance" between Meneguzzi and the facial composite of the "Avon man" provided by the two police officers on duty at the Senate and also included a letter sent by Cardinal Agostino Casaroli to Cardinal José Luis Serna Alzate, the then-priest confessor of the Orlandis. In the letter, Casaroli asked Alzate if it was true that Natalina Orlandi, Emanuela's older sister, confided to him that her uncle Mario Meneguzzi once molested her. Alzate confirmed this to be true. On TG La7, it was also mentioned that Meneguzzi appointed Gennaro Egidio as the Orlandi lawyer and that Meneguzzi had links to the Italian Secret Services.

The following day, the Orlandi family and their lawyer Laura Sgrò organized a press conference. Natalina Orlandi confirmed that this episode took place in 1978 (when she was 21 years old) but assured the audience that her uncle's actions were not molestations but rather "verbal advances", which she promptly refused, and that she and her uncle had maintained a good relationship despite this episode. Natalina stated that she had already been questioned about the incident by Magistrate Domenico Sica in 1983, in the early days of the investigations. In an interview on the following day, a retired police officer who was involved in the early investigations told that Meneguzzi had been investigated in the early days by the police, but the allegation was thought to be extraneous to Emanuela's disappearance. In any case, on the evening that Emanuela went missing, Meneguzzi was in his holiday home in Borgorose with his wife, children, and sister-in-law Anna Orlandi.

The Orlandi siblings also pointed out that in the months following the disappearance, their uncle had been the family spokesperson, appearing in press conferences, interviews, and on TV multiple times, so it would not have been odd for the police officers to confuse him with the "Avon man".

During the press conference, Natalina Orlandi revealed that she had already been aware of this file, because in 2017 she was summoned to the Vatican by Cardinal Giovanni Angelo Becciu, the then-Substitute for General Affairs in the Secretariat of State, who showed her the documents related to the incident with her uncle. In those days, the Orlandi family and their lawyer were asking the Vatican for the release of a secret dossier about Emanuela, held in the Secretariat of State, as revealed to them by Georg Gänswein. According to Natalina, Becciu told her that if they were required to give the family the dossier, the Vatican would divulge the existence of the file describing the episode between her and her uncle. Natalina commented that this seemed like blackmail. In the end, no document was given to the Orlandis.

Both Natalina and Pietro Orlandi commented that the release of these documents on television, rather than to the investigating magistrates and to police authorities, was outrageous and "a vile attempt by the Vatican to publicly attack their uncle's memory and pass the responsibility off on the family".

According to journalist Pino Nicotri, Meneguzzi was the subject of suspicions by the first two magistrates of the investigation, Margherita Gerunda and Domenico Sica. Interviewed by the journalist in 2013, Gerunda declared: "From the beginning, Meneguzzi had given rise to suspicion due to his excessively attentive behavior. It seemed that, rather than helping the investigation, he wanted to know what the investigators had discovered. We therefore decided to keep him at a distance as much as possible". Sica arranged to have Meneguzzi tailed by a police car, but Meneguzzi eventually realized he was being followed, putting an end to the operation.

== See also ==
- List of people who disappeared mysteriously (1980s)
