= James Kavanagh =

James Kavanagh may refer to:

- James B. Kavanagh (1800–1886), Irish priest, teacher and president of St. Patrick's College, Carlow
- James Kavanagh (bishop) (1914–2002), Irish priest and professor
- James Kavanagh (media personality) (born 1989), Irish social media personality and television presenter

== See also ==
- James Cavanagh (disambiguation)
- James Kavanaugh (died 2009), author of A Modern Priest Looks at His Outdated Church
