= Rene Reid =

American former Catholic nun

- Born: Rene Reid; United States
- Other name: Rene Reid Yarnell
- Education: University of Dallas; University of San Francisco
- Occupations: Broadcaster; Church reform advocate; Politician
- Organization: Catholic Church Reform International
- Known for: Co-founding Catholic Church Reform International
- Notable work: Peace Amidst Conflict (2008); A Nun's Journey (2022)
- Office: Member of the Washoe County Board of Commissioners
- Term: 1989–1993
- Website: renereid.com

Rene Reid (also published as Rene Reid Yarnell) is an American former Catholic nun, Catholic Church reform advocate, broadcaster, and elected public official based in Reno, Nevada. She is a co-founder and the director of Catholic Church Reform International. Reid has written fiction and memoirs about religion, relationships, and social conflict.

== Early life and religious vocation ==
Reid attended Ursuline Academy in Dallas, Texas, in 1962. Shortly after graduation, she joined the Daughters of Charity of St. Vincent de Paul in St. Louis, Missouri. Unable to pursue theological studies in the 1960s, Reid left to continue her education, earning a Bachelor of Arts degree in Theology from the University of Dallas (1967) and a Master of Arts degree in Theology from the University of San Francisco (1969). She served as a Religious Education Director in parishes in the San Francisco Bay Area (1969–1972) and as the only woman on the faculty of St. Patrick's Seminary in Menlo Park, California (1972–73).

== Career ==
In the 1970s and early 1980s, Reid worked in broadcasting, producing and hosting television programs and talk radio shows in San Francisco, Denver, and Reno.

In the early 1970s in San Francisco, California, Reid hosted a television show called Family Matters on KGO TV, an ABC affiliate. Supported by the Ecumenical Faith Commission, the show had a religious focus but focused on the various types of families that were emerging in the Bay Area at that time. Shortly after the launch of the TV show, the talk radio affiliate, KGO Radio, requested that the show be simulcast on their station as well. Accustomed to being able to call in and discuss topics, by popular demand, the radio show led the way to Reid's talk radio career. Reid went on to produce and host talk radio shows on KWBZ in Denver, Colorado, and later on KOH in Reno, Nevada.

=== Political career ===
From 1989 to 1993, Reid served as an elected member of the Board of County Commissioners for Washoe County in Reno, Nevada. She later wrote that a dispute over the county's 1985 transfer of the public Washoe Medical Center to private ownership had put her at odds with the rest of the board during her time in office. In one of the annual Sheep Dip stage performances, Reid's defeat of the incumbent was featured with an oversized voting booth that showed a check mark against her opponent as "Nun of the above." She served as chair of the board in 1992.

Reid and her partner Mark Yarnell served on the faculty of a college-certified course offered through the University of Illinois Chicago.

=== Catholic Church Reform International ===
Reid is co-founder, with the late Robert Blair Kaiser, of Catholic Church Reform International (CCRI) and serves as its director. According to the National Catholic Reporter, she started the organization in 2013 after walking the Camino de Santiago, with the aim of connecting church reform groups around the world.

CCRI is a nonprofit organization and global network of Catholics advocating reforms within the Catholic Church. Drawing on the principles of the Second Vatican Council, the organization promotes greater participation of the laity in church governance and expanded opportunities for women in ministry and leadership. CCRI supports the people synodally participating in the selection process of their bishops, optional celibacy for clergy, an end to both clericalism (authoritarianism of bishops) and the sexual abuse of minors, and inclusion of LGBTQ Catholics.

In October 2014, CCRI held a two-day gathering in Rome ahead of the Synod of Bishops on the family. There, Reid called for the church to revisit its teaching on birth control, make celibacy optional for clergy, and give greater equality to women. In 2015, the group publicly backed a request by the Association of U.S. Catholic Priests that the U.S. bishops open a dialogue on ordaining married men.

The organization also supports the development of virtual and local small Christian communities for Bible readings and Eucharistic gatherings.

== Writing ==
In the mid-2000s, Reid began writing what she describes as "reality fiction"—novels grounded in documented historical events, particularly the September 11 attacks and the conflicts in Afghanistan and Iraq.

Reid's first novel, Pilgrim Souls: A Search for Peace Amidst Conflict, was published in 2007. Set against the backdrop of the September 11 attacks and the Abu Ghraib prisoner abuse scandal, the novel follows twin brothers—one serving as California attorney general and the other as a government staff member serving under Colin Powell. The novel received an endorsement from Major General Antonio Taguba, whose investigation into detainee abuse at Abu Ghraib drew international attention. Taguba wrote that the novel had "the depth to make anyone relate to the facts on one of the great tragedies in U.S. history."

A revised edition of Pilgrim Souls was published in 2008 under the title Peace Amidst Conflict (Quantum Leap Publishing; ISBN 978-0-9801709-2-4). Re-released again in 2026, this fictional historical drama is set during and after the shocking reality of 9/11. It forecast Barack Obama's victory more than a year prior to his election as the 44th President of the United States.

Published in 2022, A Nun's Journey is Reid's memoir of her relationship with the former Catholic priest and poet James Kavanaugh.

== Personal life ==
Reid has one son, Chris Grove. She resides in Reno, Nevada.

== List of books ==
- 1998 – Your First Year in Network Marketing: Overcome Your Fears, Experience Success, and Achieve Your Dreams! (with Mark Yarnell; as Rene Reid Yarnell). Crown/Three Rivers Press. Business. ISBN 9780761512196
- 1998 – The New Entrepreneurs: Making a Living—Making a Life Through Network Marketing. Quantum Leap Publishing. Business.
- c. 2000s – Encyclopedia of Network Marketing. Reference.
- 2001 – 'Til Death Do Us Part.... Quantum Leap Publishing. Autobiography.
- 2002 – Your First Steps in Network Marketing. Quantum Leap Publishing. Workbook and audio program.
- 2007 – Pilgrim Souls: A Search for Peace Amidst Conflict. Reality fiction.
- 2008 – Peace Amidst Conflict. Quantum Leap Publishing. Reality fiction. ISBN 9780980170924
- 2022 – A Nun's Journey: To Motherhood, Heartache, and Wholeness. Self-published. Memoir. ISBN 9798833310038
