= Deliver Us from Evil (2006 film) =

2006 documentary film by Amy J. Berg

- Promotional poster
- Directed by: Amy J. Berg
- Written by: Amy J. Berg
- Produced by: Amy J. Berg; Matthew Cooke; Frank Donner; Hermass Lassalle
- Starring: Ann, Maria & Bob Jyono; Nancy Sloan; Adam, Becky & Phil M. Thomas Doyle; Patrick Wall; John Manly; Jeff Anderson; Dr. Mary Gail Frawley-O'Dea; Case & Jane Degroot; Oliver O'Grady
- Cinematography: Jacob Kusk; Jens Schlosser
- Edited by: Matthew Cooke
- Music by: Joseph Arthur; Mick Harvey
- Production company: Disarming Films
- Distributed by: Lionsgate
- Release date: October 13, 2006
- Running time: 101 minutes
- Country: United States
- Language: English
- Box office: $327,205

Deliver Us from Evil is a 2006 American documentary film that explores the life of Irish Catholic priest Oliver O'Grady, who admitted to having molested and raped approximately 25 children in Northern California from the late 1970s through the early 1990s. Written and directed by Amy J. Berg, it won the Best Documentary Award at the 2006 Los Angeles Film Festival and was nominated for the Academy Award for Best Documentary Feature, though it lost to An Inconvenient Truth. The title of the film refers to a line in the Lord's Prayer.

== Synopsis ==
The film chronicles O'Grady's years as a priest in Northern California, where he committed his crimes. After being convicted of child molestation in 1993 and serving seven years in prison, he was deported to his native Ireland, where Berg interviewed him in 2005. Additionally, the film presents trial documents, videotaped depositions with O'Grady and other members of the Los Angeles Archdiocese (including Monsignor Cain and Roger Mahony), and interviews with survivors of O'Grady's abuse, activists, theologians, psychologists, and lawyers. Taken together, the material suggests that Church officials were aware of O'Grady's crimes many years before his conviction, but took steps to conceal them to protect him and the Church.

== Reception ==
The film was well-received by critics. It earned a 100 percent "Fresh" critics rating from Rotten Tomatoes based on 72 reviews, with a weighted average of 8.36/10, and is currently ranked 31st among the site's highest rated documentaries of all time. The site's consensus reads: "Deliver Us from Evil is a superb documentary and a searing look at an institution protecting its leaders at the expense of its followers. A profoundly disturbing chronicle of a wolf in sheep's clothing, the film builds a clear-eyed case against pedophile priest Oliver O'Grady, and the Catholic bureaucracy that protected him. The recollections of O'Grady's victims are nothing short of shocking and heartbreaking." On Metacritic, the film has a score of 86 out of 100, based on 23 critics, indicating "universal acclaim".

The Irish Independent criticized Berg for having filmed children in Ireland without their knowledge or that of their families.

== Aftermath ==
After the documentary was shown on Dutch national TV in April 2010, members of a parish in Schiedam recognized O'Grady as an active volunteer there until January 2010. They had known nothing about his background. He had also been active in the Netherlands as an organizer of children's parties.

== Inspiration ==
Amy J. Berg in an interview with the International Documentary Association cites the cinema verité as well as the works of Stanley Kubrick, Krzysztof Kieslowski, Thomas Vinterberg, Alejandro González Iñárritu, Gus Van Sant, and Lars Von Trier as inspirations. In another interview, Berg cited documentarian Michael Moore and the Dogma 95 film movement.

== See also ==
- Catholic Church sexual abuse cases
  - Catholic Church sex abuse cases in the United States
- Roger Mahony's role in covering up sexual abuse in the Los Angeles Archdiocese
- Twist of Faith (2005), an HBO documentary film about abuse in the Catholic Church
- Mea Maxima Culpa: Silence in the House of God (2012), another HBO documentary
- Holy Water-Gate, a 2004 documentary
- Secrets of the Vatican, a 2014 documentary
- Sex Crimes and the Vatican, a 2006 BBC documentary
- Spotlight, a 2015 film about The Boston Globe's 2001 investigation into cases of child sex abuse in the Boston area by Catholic priests
- List of films with a 100% rating on Rotten Tomatoes, a film review aggregator website
