= Thaddeus Jones =

Thaddeus Jones may refer to:

- Tad Jones (music historian) (1952–2007), American music historian and researcher
- Thaddeus Jones (politician), American politician and mayor of Calumet City, Illinois
- Thad Jones, American jazz trumpeter, composer and bandleader
