= Up from the Cradle of Jazz =

Book about the history of jazz and blues music in New Orleans

- 2nd edition cover
- Author: Jason Berry, Jonathan Foose, Tad Jones
- Language: English
- Subject: New Orleans music history
- Genre: Music history, musicology
- Published: 1986, 2009
- Publisher: University of Georgia Press
- Publication place: United States
- Media type: Print (hardcover and paperback)
- Pages: 285 (first edition); 373 (second edition)
- ISBN: 978-0-8203-0853-1
- OCLC: 263157308

Up from the Cradle of Jazz: New Orleans Music Since World War II is a book by Jason Berry, Jonathan Foose and Tad Jones. It chronicles the history of New Orleans music, primarily rhythm and blues, and its evolution post-World War II. It was first published in 1986. An expanded second edition was published in 2009.

== Synopsis ==
In early 20th century New Orleans was a cultural melting pot and had a vibrant music scene. This gave way to the development of jazz by African-American musicians of the city, a genre which incorporated multiple influences. The emergence of new musical genres continued in New Orleans, and by 1950s rhythm and blues had gained a foothold as an established style.

The book chronicles the course of music evolution in New Orleans post-World War II from jazz to primarily rhythm and blues as well as rock and roll and avant-garde jazz. It presents a historical accounting along with cultural influences that morphed the New Orleans sound, such as Mardi Gras Indians, Caribbean influences, musical families, generational continuity, iconic individuals, clubs and recording studios. The first edition published in 1986 consists of nineteen chapters categorized under four headings:

- Origins of New Orleans rhythm-and-blues
- The flush years, 1954–1963
- Struggling out of the sixties
- The Caribbean connection

A second edition published in 2009 has additional content, including the Hurricane Katrina devastation and subsequent efforts to restore the music community. The book is not all encompassing in term of genres, and transformations in traditional jazz, Dixieland and gospel are intentionally left out by the authors.

== Reception ==
Gary Giddins of The Village Voice wrote, the authors "show how subsequent generations of New Orleans musicians helped spark the postwar phenomena of rhythm and blues, rock 'n' roll, and even avant-garde jazz," and said the book "makes a worthy contribution in demystifying the still vibrant music of New Orleans." Kenan Torrans of The Washington Times wrote, the "personal interviews" and "interwoven stories of various New Orleans neighborhoods, nightclubs, bars and other historic music venues (...) give the reader a very real sense of life in the Big Easy." In the Journal of American Studies, Andrew Clark wrote, the book pays "tribute to the variety and durability of music as the city's historic language and bi-racial culture," and called the presentation an "oral record".
