= Alessandro Diddi =

Promoter of justice of the Vatican City State

Professor Alessandro Diddi holds the office of promoter of justice of the Vatican City State. Diddi had previously served as an adjunct prosecutor for the Vatican.
