= Frank Terpil =

American intelligence officer and rogue advisor and arms maker to multiple dictators

Frank Edward Terpil (Nov 2, 1939 – March 1, 2016) was a CIA agent born in Brooklyn, New York, U.S. in 1939, who was asked to leave the agency for misconduct in 1971. He then "went rogue", going to work for Edwin P. Wilson's operations supplying arms, bomb making training, and surveillance equipment to numerous regimes.

== Life ==
He joined the United States Army at 18 and served for six years. His second assignment was at the Army Security Branch in Arlington, Virginia where he repaired cryptographic equipment.

After serving in the Army, Terpil joined the CIA in 1965, working in the Technical Services division, which adapted technology and weaponry for covert work. After departing from the CIA, he supplied dictators including Muammar Gaddafi of Libya and Idi Amin of Uganda from a base in Crewe, an English town. In 1980, a U.S. court indicted him on charges of large-scale illegal arms dealing. He skipped bail and left the U.S.; in 1981, he was sentenced in absentia to 53 years' imprisonment, with the judge describing his operations as "trade in death and destruction". He was also allegedly involved in a plot to assassinate anti-Gaddafi dissident Umar Muhayshi. However, he was never put on the FBI most wanted list. He moved to Lebanon, offering his services to Yasser Arafat of the PLO.

In 1982, journalist David Fanning and director Antony Thomas produced Frank Terpil: Confessions of a Dangerous Man, which won the Emmy Award for best investigative documentary. The pair travelled to Beirut to spend five days talking with Terpil, then returned with a film crew to shoot more than eight hours of interviews.

When Israel invaded Lebanon in 1982, Terpil moved to Cuba, at that time in dispute with the U.S. and subject to an embargo. Terpil worked for the General Intelligence Directorate, trying to persuade CIA agents to defect, though he was not ideologically aligned with the government. Terpil and fugitive Robert Vesco joined forces and offered their network of contacts to the Cuban government.

In the mid-1990s, there was a slight improvement in relations between the U.S. and Cuba; Terpil and Vesco were put under house arrest for defrauding Cuba. It was reported that Vesco died in Havana in 2007, but Terpil maintained that Vesco had fled to Sierra Leone.

In later years, Terpil posed as Robert Hunter, an Australian retiree, living with a young Cuban wife at the Playas del Este, outside Havana. In later years, he was concerned that improved U.S.-Cuba relations might lead to his deportation to the U.S.

In 2015, his health was bad; one leg and part of the other foot were amputated following diabetes-related complications. He is reported to have died of heart failure on 1 March 2016 at the age of 76, three weeks before U.S. president Barack Obama was to make the first visit of a U.S. president to neighboring Cuba in 88 years; it has been suggested that he faked his own death.

== See also ==
- Theodore Shackley
