= Thomas P. Doyle =

American Dominican priest

Thomas Patrick Doyle (born 1944) is an American priest and canon lawyer. He is a former member of the Dominican Order.

== Biography ==
Doyle attended the Aquinas Institute of Philosophy, the University of Wisconsin, Aquinas Institute of Theology, the Catholic University of America, and the University of Ottawa. He holds a Pontifical Licentiate in Canon Law from St. Paul University, and a Pontifical Doctorate in Canon Law from Catholic University of America. He also served as an officer in the United States Air Force from 1986 to 2004.

Doyle has taught at several universities and seminaries, including Catholic Theological Union, Catholic University of America, and the Midwestern Tribunal Institute of Mundelein Seminary. Doyle also held several positions in Catholic dioceses. He served as a Tribunal Judge for the Archdiocese of Chicago, Diocese of Scranton, the Diocese of Pensacola/Tallahassee, the Archdiocese of Military Services, and the Diocese of Lafayette in Indiana. He served as the Advocate and Defender of the Bond for the Archdiocese of Chicago.

In 1981-1986, Doyle worked in the apostolic nunciature in Washington, D.C., where he prepared files and responded to letters received by the nuncio.

Doyle was one of the first people in the Catholic Church to bring attention to sexual abuse by clergy. In 1985, along with fellow priest and doctor Michael Peterson and the lawyer Ray Mouton, Doyle authored a report on medical and legal issues raised by pedophilia in the priesthood, and warned of heavy legal and financial consequences if the hierarchy did not act

Doyle is a columnist for the National Catholic Reporter. His work with clergy abuse survivors has been featured in the documentaries Holy Water-Gate: Abuse Cover-up in the Catholic Church, Deliver Us From Evil, Alex Gibney's Mea Maxima Culpa: Silence in the House of God, in Robert Kaiser's book Whistle: Fr. Doyle's Steadfast Witness for Victims of Clerical Abuse, and on PBS's show Frontline episode Secrets of the Vatican.
