= Disappearance of Mirella Gregori =

Italian teenager missing since 1983

Mirella Gregori
- Born: Mirella Gregori; 7 October 1967; Rome, Italy
- Disappeared: 7 May 1983 (aged 15); Rome, Italy
- Status: Missing for 43 years, 4 months and 29 days
- Height: 5 ft 5 in (1.65 m)

Mirella Gregori (born 7 October 1967) mysteriously disappeared from Rome on 7 May 1983, about forty days before the disappearance of Emanuela Orlandi, a citizen of Vatican City. Both vanishings are unsolved as of today.

== Circumstances of disappearance ==
Gregori left her house around 3:30 pm after receiving an apparent call from a former classmate of her middle-school called "Alessandro". She then told her mother she would meet with the classmate outside and would be back in 10 minutes. Gregori then entered the bar just under her home to meet with the owner's daughter, Sonia De Vito, her best friend. The two girls talked privately locked in the bathroom for around 10 minutes, then Gregori left the bar and went outside. That was the last time she was seen.

In the first hours after the disappearance, the police questioned Alessandro, the former classmate of Gregori, but it was proven that at the time of Gregori's disappearance, he was somewhere else and that he hadn't seen Mirella in months.

== Linking to the Orlandi case ==
In August 1983, three months after Gregori's disappearance, her disappearance was linked to the disappearance of another 15-year-old girl, Emanuela Orlandi, a Vatican citizen, who went missing on 22 June, 40 days after Gregori, and whose kidnapping was claimed by an unnamed terrorist organization demanding the release of Mehmet Ali Ağca, the man who shot and wounded Pope John Paul II in Saint Peter's Square on 13 May 1981. Italian President Sandro Pertini made a public appeal for the girls' release on 20 October 1983, linking the two cases in the public consciousness. Despite the claims and demands of the alleged kidnappers, no actual proof was ever given that the kidnappers were actually holding either Orlandi or Gregori.

In a phone call with Gennaro Egidio, the lawyer and spokesman of the Orlandis and Gregoris families, on 27 October 1983, "the American" announced the death of Mirella Gregori, saying they would return her body one week before Christmas, but nothing was ever given. When Egidio asked about Orlandi, "the American" replied he had nothing to say about her for the moment.

Fourteen years later, in 1997, the first investigation of the Orlandi–Gregori cases was dismissed by the public prosecutor of Rome due to a lack of new evidence. In his official statement, the magistrature classified the theory of Orlandi's kidnapping by international terrorists as a misdirection and Judge Adele Rando characterized the linking of Gregori's disappearance with Orlandi's as unfounded.

== Suspects ==
During a visit of the Pope to a Rome parish, on 15 December 1985, Gregori's mother recognized a man in the papal escort as the person who often enjoyed some time with her daughter at the bar some days before her disappearance. This man was Raoul Bonarelli, the then-deputy chief of the Gendarmerie of the Vatican City. In 1993, Bonarelli was questioned on the matter by judge Adele Rando but was later dismissed due lack of evidences and due to the fact that Gregori's mother no longer recognized him.

In the 2000s, Judge Otello Lupacchini and journalist Max Parisi conducted a study of over twelve cases of young girls missing and murdered in Rome between 1982 and 1990 and hypothesized that all of them were victims of a serial killer, due to the similarities of the murders and their proximity within the city. Some of these include the murders of Katy Skerl and Simonetta Cesaroni, two major unsolved crimes in Italy. Lupacchini and Parisi put forth the theory that both Mirella Gregori and Emanuela Orlandi were victims of this serial killer. According to them, this man lured the girls with job offers, like selling Avon products, and then kidnapped and killed them. Gregori and Orlandi, who were the only two minors on this list of victims, were also the only ones whose bodies were never found.

In 2016, while conducting a study on the judicial documents on the Orlandi case, Italian journalist Tommaso Nelli found a document of the SISDE dated 31 October 1983, of a report made by a SISDE agent who was charged to control the bar under Gregori's home, a bar that was highly frequented by Mirella. On the report, the agent reported a conversation between Sonia De Vito, the daughter of the bar's owners and best friend of Mirella Gregori, who, while talking to another girl said: "Yes, he knew us. We didn't know him. As he took Mirella he could have taken me, since we used to go together". If this SISDE report is true, this implies that Sonia De Vito was aware of the identity of the man who took Mirella Gregori.

== Reopening of the case ==
In November 2023, the Italian Senate overwhelmingly voted to initiate a new parliamentary investigation into the four-decade-old cold cases surrounding the disappearances of Mirella Gregori and Emanuela Orlandi.

== See also ==
- Banda della Magliana
- Grey Wolves member Mehmet Ali Ağca's 1981 attempt to assassinate the Pope
- List of people who disappeared mysteriously: 1910–1990
