= Lucio Ángel Vallejo Balda =

Vatican monsignor

Lucio Ángel Vallejo Balda (born in Villamediana de Iregua, Logroño, Spain, 12 June 1961) is a Vatican monsignor who was jailed for leaking official documents in the Vatileaks scandal. The clergyman admitted to passing classified documents to journalists. He is the highest-ranking Vatican official ever to be arrested. Pope Francis granted him clemency after he served half of the 18-month jail sentence.

Vallejo was the secretary of the Prefecture for the Economic Affairs of the Holy See, a senior finance official in the Vatican, and second-ranked official in his department. He was a member of the Pontifical Commission for Reference on the Organization of the Economic-Administrative Structure of the Holy See (COSEA) which was set up by Pope Francis to examine Vatican finances. Vallejo was the only Vatican employee on COSEA and head of the administration for it.

He was charged with leaking documents to Italian journalists and claimed he was manipulated by co-defendant and PR consultant Francesca Chaouqui who, he said, seduced him in a hotel in Florence in 2014. Chaouqui denied this, and suggested instead that he was gay.

Vallejo was found guilt of stealing documents and passing them to journalists on 7 July 2016 and was imprisoned in a cell in Vatican City by the Gendarme Corps of Vatican City State. He was released under house arrest but later return to jail for using a mobile phone.

Vallejo is a member of the Priestly Society of the Holy Cross, associated with Catholic organisation Opus Dei. Following his release from prison he was returned to the Diocese of Astorga in Spain.

== See also ==
- Vatican leaks scandal
- Carlo Maria Viganò
