= Saeed Kamali Dehghan =

Iranian-British journalist

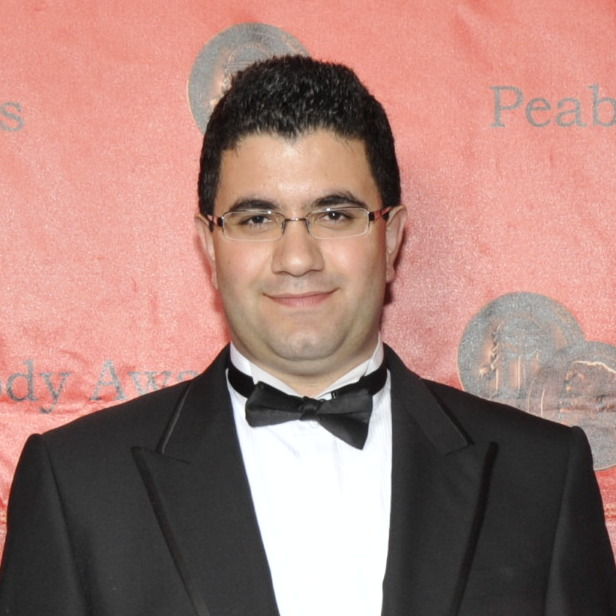
- Born: Persian: سعید کمالی دهقان; 1 May 1985 (age 41); Karaj, Iran
- Occupation: Journalist

Saeed Kamali Dehghan (Persian: سعید کمالی دهقان; born 1 May 1985 in Karaj, Iran) is an Iranian-British journalist who has written for The Guardian. He was named as the 2010 Journalist of the Year in Britain by the Foreign Press Association. He is a staff journalist for The Guardian working from its London offices, and has been an Iran correspondent from Tehran for the newspaper in the past, especially in summer 2009. He is a co-producer of the 2010 HBO documentary For Neda, which was a recipient of the 70th annual Peabody Award.

== Biography ==
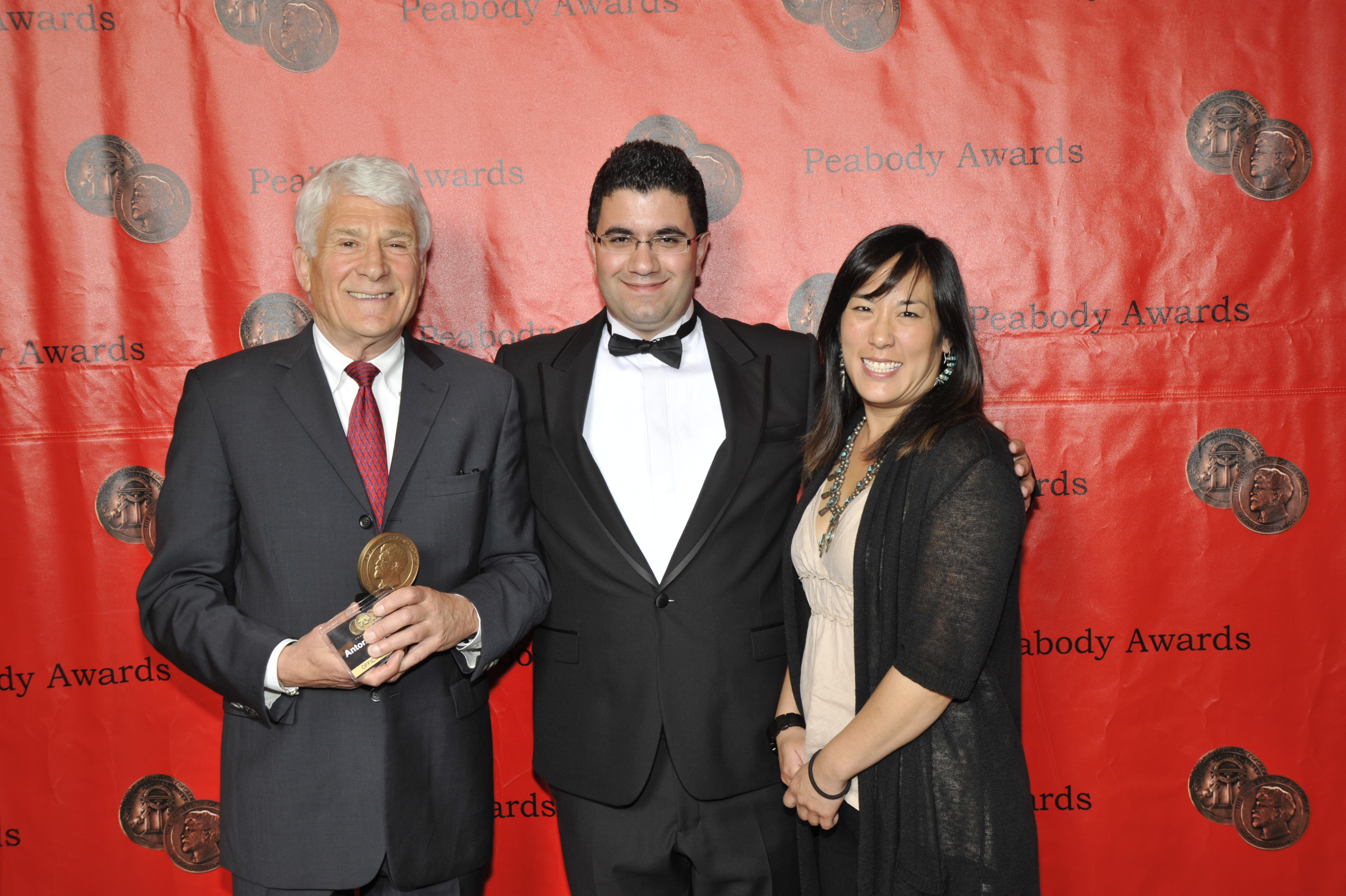
Antony Thomas, Kamali Dehghan and producer Carleen L. Hsu with a Peabody Award, May 2011

Kamali Dehghan was born on 1 May 1985 in Karaj, a city near Tehran, the capital of Iran. He graduated in 2011 from the City University Department of Journalism, with a Master of Arts (MA) degree in International Journalism, after receiving a scholarship from Open Society Institute. His BA was in Rolling Stock Engineering from Iran University of Science and Technology.

He has written in Persian, English, and French for several different newspapers around the world, including Le Monde, Shargh and Etemaad. He covered Tehran unrest after the Iranian presidential election, 2009, for the foreign media, including CNN, CBC, France 24, Channel 4 and The Guardian.

=== For Neda (2010) ===
Saeed Kamali Dehghan was a co-producer of the 2010 HBO documentary For Neda. On 3 March 2020, in an interview with Iranian state newspaper Tehran Times, he said he regrets making that documentary because "I was naive to believe the Western narrative about her death. As a journalist, I was sent to Iran to humanize their narrative naively, but I didn't know their narrative. When they got my footage from me, from then on, I was nobody, and I was deeply upset about the film, even though I didn’t show it at the time."

=== Twelve Plus One (2017) ===
Saeed Kamali Dehghan's first book, Twelve Plus One, was published in Iran in January 2017 by Ofoq Publications. It is a collection of his interviews with 12 writers and one film-maker, including Mario Vargas Llosa, Paul Auster, EL Doctorow and David Lynch. He has conducted several other original interviews with internationally known writers including John Barth, E. L. Doctorow, Eric-Emmanuel Schmitt, Amélie Nothomb, Andreï Makine, Isabel Allende, Tzvetan Todorov, T. C. Boyle, Alain de Botton and Noam Chomsky.

=== Detention in Morocco ===
In September 2019, he was detained in and then expelled from Morocco for reporting there for The Guardian about anti-corruption protests.

=== Murder of Jamal Khashoggi (2018) ===
On 8 November 2018, Kamali Dehghan tweeted that Saudi Arabian journalist Jamal Khashoggi had been murdered because he was planning on publishing details about the network Iran International's ties to Mohammed bin Salman and Saud al-Qahtani. Shortly afterwards, he deleted the tweets. The Iranian foreign minister, Mohammad Javad Zarif, dismissed the comments as "improbable".

He was reassigned from the Iran desk of his newspaper as a result of these claims, and subsequently suffered from poor mental health.

== Awards ==
Saeed Kamali Dehghan was named the 2010 Journalist of the Year by the Foreign Press Association (FPA) in London. His co-produced film For Neda received the FPA award for the Best Documentary of the Year, and was also a recipient at the 70th annual Peabody Awards at a ceremony hosted by Larry King at the Waldorf-Astoria in New York on 23 May 2011.
