= Frank Donner (film producer) =

American film producer

- Born: 1963 (age 62–63); Chicago, Illinois
- Occupation: Film producer

Frank Donner, III, (born 1963 in Chicago) is an American film producer and digital marketing executive. As a producer, he is best known for the Academy Award-nominated documentary film Deliver Us from Evil (2006) about the sex abuse cases in the Roman Catholic Church. Donner also produced "Between", which screened in competition at the 2005 Sundance Film Festival.

Donner started in the film business as an actor, studying at the Stella Adler Conservatory alongside Mark Ruffalo, Salma Hayek, and Benicio del Toro. Donner left acting for other pursuits in the entertainment industry, such as film development and content management.

Donner served as the President of Elektrofilm Digital Studios, shepherding the company from its infancy into a large media technology business.

Donner is still active in film production and creative undertakings; he recently served as a juror for the 2011 Santa Barbara International Film Festival. He has concentrated his attention on a new venture, BLKBX Creative Group, a digital firm that has run large social media and marketing campaigns for films such as Inception, The Expendables, Alvin and the Chipmunks, and Machete.
