= Antony Thomas =

English documentary filmmaker

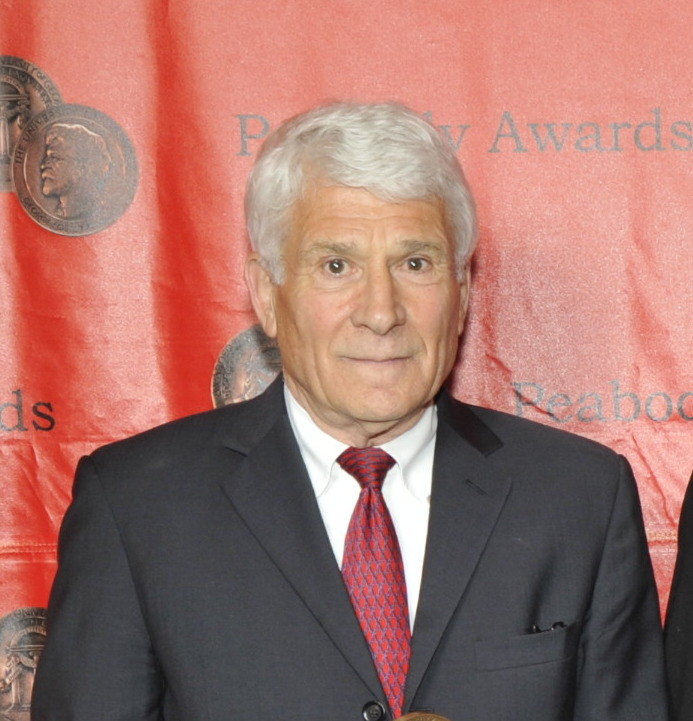
- Thomas at the 70th Annual Peabody Awards
- Born: 26 July 1940 (age 86); Calcutta, British India
- Occupations: Filmmaker, director, author
- Years active: 1963–present

Antony Thomas (born 26 July 1940) is an English documentary filmmaker, director and author who has made films for, among others, Channel 4, the BBC and HBO.

== Biography ==
Thomas was born in India. When he was six years old, he moved to South Africa. He moved again to England in 1967, where he has written, directed and produced 40 major documentaries and dramas, including Death of a Princess (1980). In 1982 Thomas and journalist David Fanning produced Frank Terpil: Confessions of a Dangerous Man, which won the Emmy Award for best investigative documentary.

Thomas wrote Rhodes, a 1996 British television drama based on the life of Cecil Rhodes.

On 14 June 2010 the documentary film For Neda, made by Thomas with the help of Saeed Kamali Dehghan, on the death of Iranian demonstrator Neda Agha-Soltan, was released. Kamali Dehghan secretly filmed Neda's family and obtained footage of her life and death for the HBO documentary. In late February 2014, the documentary Secrets of the Vatican directed by Thomas was aired on PBS as part of the Frontline series.

== Books ==
- The Arab Experience, with Michael Deakin (Namara/Quartet, 1975) ISBN 978-0-704-32097-0.
- Rhodes (BBC Books, 1996) ISBN 978-0-563-38742-8.
- In the Line of Fire: Memories of Documentary Filmmaker (Unicorn, 2022) ISBN 978-1-914-41433-6.
