= Digital firm =

The digital firm is a kind of organization that has enabled core business relationships through digital networks. In these digital networks are supported by enterprise class technology platforms that have been leveraged within an organization to support critical business functions and services. Some examples of these technology platforms are customer relationship management (CRM), supply chain management (SCM), enterprise resource planning (ERP), knowledge management system (KMS), enterprise content management (ECM), and warehouse management system (WMS) among others. The purpose of these technology platforms is to digitally enable seamless integration and information exchange within the organization to employees and outside the organization to customers, suppliers, and other business partners.

== History ==
=== Origin of "the digital firm" ===
The term "digital firm" originated, as a concept in a series of management information systems (MIS) books authored by Kenneth C. Laudon. It provides a new way to describe organizations that operate differently than the traditional brick and mortar business as a result of broad sweeping changes in technology and global markets. Digital firms place an emphasis on the digitization of business processes and services through sophisticated technology and information systems. These information systems create opportunities for digital firms to decentralize operations, accelerate market readiness and responsiveness, enhance customer interactions, as well as increase efficiencies across a variety of business functions.

=== Acceleration of technology adoption ===
Technology adoption has been increasing as digital firms continually look to achieve greater levels cost savings, competitive advantage, and operational performance optimization. As organizations adopt technology, the internal appetite for additional technologies increases and, in some cases, accelerates. This acceleration of technology adoption by digital firms creates a "digital divide". Emerging technology is absorbed at varying rates across organizations. This technology divergence can affect competitive dynamics in the marketplace between firms that achieve operational benefits from the technology and firms which have yet to adapt.

While the growth of new technology consumption is not uniform across organizations, the trend for business-driven investment in technology across all markets has and continues to increase. During the span of 1990 to 2006, the gross U.S. domestic investment in information and communications technology, as measured by the U.S. Census Bureau, increased by 170%.

The market for enterprise resource planning (ERP) systems and other packaged applications started to grow substantially during the 1990s to the point that the ERP market alone accounts for approximately $25 billion. According to surveys conducted in 2002, nearly "75% of global Fortune 1000 firms had implemented SAP’s ERP suite".

Many businesses are aware of the need to further digitalize in the post-COVID-19 climate, but those in less developed areas have traditionally been slower to do so.

== Advantages ==
According to the European Commission, as of 2022, across all economic categories, digital enterprises have been more likely than their non-digital counterparts to increase employment. Manufacturing (33%) or infrastructure (30%) are the two industries in Europe with the most digital and environmentally friendly businesses.

Additionally, digital enablement of core business functions and services provides an organization with opportunities to:

- Operate business continuously ("Time shifting")
- Operate business in a global workplace ("Space shifting")
- Adapt business strategies to meet market demands
- Create business value from technology investments
- Drive efficiency improvements in inventory and supply chain
- Enhance the management of customer relationships
- Improve organizational productivity

== Effects on organizational performance ==
Technology and information systems serve many critical roles in a digital firm by providing technology-driven capabilities that increase operational performance. For example, digital networks and information systems allow organizations to connect and integrate supply chains in ways that are real-time, uninterrupted and highly responsive to market conditions.

Another example of an information system that can increase an organization's performance awareness and management capabilities is a real-time business intelligence (RTBI) system. A RTBI system can provide a highly responsive and strategic decision support platform for an organization to analyze operational events as they occur. RTBI systems often work closely with organizational risk management (ORM) systems in this capacity to increase capabilities around monitoring operational performance and assessing operational risks. These types of information systems can increase an organization's capabilities to effectively manage performance and productivity.

The three main enterprise information systems that can positively affect an organization's performance and productivity are:

=== Enterprise resource planning (ERP) ===
ERP deployments can be complex and require a significant shift in business operations for an organization, but the benefits can be substantial.

After implementation of an ERP system within an organization there are measurable performance and productivity gains that can be directly correlated to the ERP system go-live event. This study conducted a detailed analysis of the ERP data produced and found that there was a direct causal relationship between ERP systems and performance gains in an organization.

Organizations that deploy ERP systems typically, based on performance and productivity gains, also implement both of the following enterprise platforms as well.

=== Customer relationship management (CRM) ===
Organizations leverage CRM systems to improve the overall management of their relationships with customers. CRM systems operate as enterprise platforms that provide digital firms with opportunities to closely manage all aspects of interactions with customers through customer-oriented business processes.

Organizations which implement CRM systems may encounter some lag time until the CRM productivity affects are fully realized in the firm based on studies. However, the lag effects are difficult to measure and based in part on the organization's ability to leverage the new CRM system and adapt to the changes in business operations as a result.

=== Supply chain management (SCM) ===
Studies of organizations that implemented SCM systems to improve supply chain management capabilities found that those systems had a significant impact on productivity and performance within the organization. Additionally, the implementation of SCM and CRM systems differed from an ERP implementation in that organizational performance could be directly correlated "with both the initial purchase and go-live event".

SCM and CRM systems are often viewed as "extended enterprise systems" due to the way that they integrate with ERP systems and the benefits that they bring to organizations.

== See also ==
- Information systems
- Management information system (MIS)
- Enterprise resource planning (ERP)
- Customer relationship management (CRM)
- Supply chain management (SCM)
- Warehouse management system (WMS)
- Real-time business intelligence (RTBI)
- Organizational risk management (ORM)
- Knowledge management system (KMS)
- Enterprise content management (ECM)
- Office automation systems (OAS)
- Expert systems
- Software as a service (SaaS)
