= Robert Blair Kaiser =

American writer (1931–2015)

Robert Blair Kaiser (January 11, 1931 – April 2, 2015) was an American author and journalist, best known for his writing on the Catholic Church.

== Biography ==
Kaiser trained as a Jesuit from 1949 to 1959. He left the order and his intention to be ordained to the priesthood, to become a journalist and to marry.

As a correspondent for Time Magazine, he won the Overseas Press Club's Ed Cunningham Award in 1962 for the "best magazine reporting from abroad" for his reporting on the Second Vatican Council.

From 1981 until 1983, Kaiser was the Chairman of the University of Nevada's Journalism Department in Reno. Rapid growth of the department, prior to becoming an independent school from the College of Arts and Science, happened under Kaiser's tenure.

Four of his sixteen published books deal with Catholic Church reform. His books include A Church in Search of Itself: Benedict XVI and the Battle for the Future and Cardinal Mahony: A Novel. A new version of his 1970 best seller, R.F.K. Must Die! was published in 2008, with a new sub-title, Chasing the Mystery of the Robert Kennedy Assassination.

In a speech in Ireland on August 19, 2010, at the Humbert Summer School, entitled "Catholic Church Reform: No More Thrones", Kaiser called for Irish Catholics to boldly initiate an ecclesiastical revolution through which they would remove secretive hierarchy, take back their cathedrals, and elect their own bishops. He was co-founder of takebackourchurch.org, a web community of American Catholics seeking "ownership and citizenship in the people's church envisioned at Vatican II", Catholic Church Reform International and on the Board of Directors of Catholic Church Reform International.

== Selected works ==
- Pope, Council, and World: The Story of Vatican II (1963).
- "R. F. K. Must Die!": A History of the Robert Kennedy Assassination and Its Aftermath. New York: Dutton (1970). ISBN 0525191119.
- The Politics of Sex and Religion: A Case History in the Development of Doctrine, 1962-1984. Kansas City, MO: Leaven Press (1985). ISBN 0-934134-16-2.
- The Encyclical That Never Was: The Story of the Commission on Population, Family and Birth, 1964-66. London: Sheed & Ward (1987). ISBN 0-7220-3405-9.
- Clerical Error: A True Story. New York: Continuum (2002). ISBN 0-8264-1384-6.
- A Church in Search of Itself: Benedict XVI and the Battle for the Future. New York: Knopf (2006). ISBN 0-375-41064-3.
- "R.F.K. Must Die!": Chasing the Mystery of the Robert Kennedy Assassination. (2008). ISBN 1-59020-124-8.
- Cardinal Mahony: A Novel. Phoenix, Ariz.: Humble Bee Press (2008). ISBN 978-0-9646642-9-6.
- Inside the Jesuits: How Pope Francis is Changing the Church and the World. Lanham, Maryland: Rowman & Littlefield (2014). ISBN 978-1-4422-2901-3.
- Whistle: Tom Doyle's Steadfast Witness For Victims of Clerical Sexual Abuse. (2015) ISBN 978-1514327616.
