= Vatican leaks scandal =

2012 scandal involving leaked Vatican documents

In 2012, Italian journalist Gianluigi Nuzzi published letters from Archbishop Carlo Maria Viganò in which he exposed corruption that caused the Holy See to pay increased prices for contracts.

During the following months, the situation intensified as documents were leaked to Italian journalists, revealing power struggles inside the Vatican due to its efforts to implement greater financial transparency and comply with international norms to fight money laundering. In early 2012, an anonymous letter made newspaper headlines for its warning of a death threat against Pope Benedict XVI. The scandal increased in May 2012 when Nuzzi published a book entitled His Holiness: The Secret Papers of Benedict XVI consisting of confidential letters and memos between Pope Benedict and his personal secretary, a controversial book that describes the Vatican as riven with jealousy, intrigue and factional fighting. The book reveals details about the Pope's personal finances and includes tales of bribes made to procure an audience with him.

== Leaks ==
The scandal was first revealed during late January 2012 by a television program named The Untouchables (Gli intoccabili), broadcast in Italy by La7, and increased during May 2012 when Gianluigi Nuzzi published a book entitled His Holiness: The Secret Papers of Benedict XVI consisting of confidential letters and memorandums.

Among the documents were letters written both to the Pope and to the Secretary of State, Cardinal Tarcisio Bertone, by then apostolic nuncio to the United States, Italian Archbishop Carlo Maria Viganò, complaining of corruption in Vatican finances and a campaign of defamation against him. Viganò, formerly the second-ranked Vatican administrator to the Pope, allegedly asked not to be transferred for having exposed corruption that cost the Holy See artificially high contract prices.

An anonymous document described a conversation with Cardinal Paolo Romeo of Palermo, Sicily, in which he allegedly predicted the Pope would be dead within twelve months. According to John L. Allen Jr., none of the information leaked seemed "especially fatal". "It's not so much the content of the leaks, but the fact of them, which is the real problem".

== Vatican internal investigation ==
The Vatican investigation of the leaks worked along several tracks, with Vatican magistrates pursuing the criminal investigation and the Vatican Secretariat of State an administrative investigation. In March 2012, Pope Benedict appointed a commission of cardinals to investigate the leaks. The three cardinals appointed by Benedict acted in a supervisory role, examining more than the narrow criminal scope of the leaks and interviewing much of the Vatican bureaucracy; they purportedly discovered a sex and blackmail scandal. They reported directly to the Pope, and could both share information with Vatican prosecutors and receive information from them, according to Vatican spokesman the Reverend Federico Lombardi. The group was directed by Cardinal Julián Herranz Casado, an Opus Dei prelate who headed the Vatican's legal office as well as the disciplinary commission of the Vatican bureaucracy before retiring.

== Papal response ==
On 30 May 2012, Pope Benedict made his first direct comments on the scandal in remarks at the end of his weekly general audience. He said the "exaggerated" and "gratuitous" rumours had offered a false image of the Holy See, commenting: "The events of recent days about the Curia and my collaborators have brought sadness in my heart. ...I want to renew my trust in and encouragement of my closest collaborators and all those who every day, with loyalty and a spirit of sacrifice and in silence, help me fulfill my ministry."

On 26 July, Pope Benedict held a meeting of the commission of cardinals. Also in attendance were the chief of the Vatican police, the judges involved with the case, and representatives of the Vatican Secretariat of State, according to a report from Federico Lombardi.

Months later, after Paolo Gabriele and Claudio Sciarpelletti—two Vatican aides—were convicted for the case, he pardoned them.

== Arrests and convictions ==
Paolo Gabriele, who had been the pope's personal butler since 2007, was arrested by Vatican police on 23 May 2012, after confidential letters and documents addressed to the Pope and other Vatican officials were found in his Vatican apartment. He seemed to have been leaking classified information to the journalist Gianluigi Nuzzi. Similar documents had been published by Italian media during the previous five months; many of them dealt with allegations of corruption, abuse of power and a lack of financial accountability at the Vatican.

Piero Antonio Bonnet, the Vatican's judge, had been instructed to examine the evidence of the case and to decide whether there was sufficient material to proceed to trial. Gabriele faced a maximum sentence of eight years for the illegal possession of documents of a chief of state.

Paolo Gabriele was indicted by Vatican magistrates on 13 August 2012 for aggravated theft. The first hearing occurred on 29 September 2012.

Gabriele's trial began on 2 October 2012. He claimed to have stolen the documents to fight "evil and corruption" and put the Vatican "back on track". Multiple evaluations of Gabriele's mental health provided conflicting results: one report concluded that Gabriele suffered from a "fragile personality with paranoid tendencies covering profound personal insecurity", while another found that Gabriele showed no adequate signs of a major psychological disorder nor posing any serious threat to himself or others. Vatican police seized encrypted documents and confidential papers that the Pope had marked "to be destroyed" when they raided the apartment of his butler, the court heard.

On 6 October, Paolo Gabriele was found to be guilty of theft, and was sentenced to a reduced sentence of 18 months. He was also ordered to pay legal expenses. However, Gabriele served his sentence in the Vatican itself, as opposed to the usual arrangement of sending prisoners to serve time in an Italian prison, due to concerns that he might reveal more secrets.

Claudio Sciarpelletti, a computer specialist at the Secretariat of State who allegedly helped Gabriele, was arrested and convicted of obstruction of justice based on conflicting information he gave to prosecutors. He was sentenced to four months, which was amended to two months suspended with five years' probation due to his long years of service and lack of a prior criminal record.

== Aftermath of the investigation ==
One of the reasons listed for the dismissal of Ettore Gotti Tedeschi as president of the Vatican Bank was the "Failure to provide any formal explanation for the dissemination of documents last known to be in the president's possession."

On 17 December 2012, the Pope received a report on "Vatican lobbies" prepared by Cardinals Julián Herranz, Salvatore De Giorgi, a former archbishop of Palermo, and Jozef Tomko. The same day, the Pope reportedly decided to resign, a decision he made public in February 2013, becoming the first in almost 600 years to resign of his own volition. The resignation of Pope Benedict XVI occurred on 28 February.

Vatican spokesman Federico Lombardi, speaking on Vatican Radio on 23 February 2013, strongly criticized media coverage of the report as a financial scandal which purportedly became, upon the cardinals' internal investigation, a homosexual sex and blackmail scandal as well. Although the dossier was available only to Pope Emeritus Benedict XVI and the investigators themselves, the latter were free to discuss the results of their investigation with the cardinal electors of the March 2013 papal conclave, and the dossier itself was to have been given to Benedict's successor, Pope Francis. On 1 March 2013, Lombardi reported that "two or three phones" had been tapped.

On 12 June 2013, it was reported that leaked notes of a private conversation between Pope Francis and Catholic officials at the Latin American Conference of Religious confirmed the existence of "a stream of corruption", and that "the 'gay lobby' is mentioned, and it is true, it is there. ...We need to see what we can do." According to La Repubblica: "Vatican investigators had identified a network of gay prelates." Vatican spokesman Federico Lombardi made no comment on the remarks made in "a private meeting".

In July 2016, the Vatican Court acquitted the two journalists involved in the "Vatileaks" trial, citing freedom of expression as its reason. Judge Giuseppe Della Torre, director of the tribunal of the Vatican City State, declared that "the court had no legitimate jurisdiction over Gianluigi Nuzzi and Emiliano Fittipaldi." Monsignor Lucio Balda, by contrast, was sentenced to 18 months in prison for leaking official documents and his sentence began on 22 August in a cell within the confines of the Vatican. Requests for a papal pardon for Balda were met with silence, until Pope Francis granted him clemency after he served half his jail sentence.

Paolo Gabriele died on 24 November 2020, at the age of 54, following a long illness.

== In popular culture ==
The 2019 film The Two Popes primarily takes place in the aftermath of the scandal.

== See also ==
- Vatican money laundering investigation
- Financial Information Authority (Vatican City)
- Ettore Balestrero
- Index of Vatican City–related articles
