= Federico Cammeo =

- Born: 1872; Milan, Italy
- Died: 1939; Florence, Italy
- Occupation: jurist

Federico Cammeo (1872 - 1939) was an Italian jurist and an important figure in the public law of the Fascist era in Italy.

== Biography ==
Cammeo taught at the University of Cagliari from 1901, at the University of Padua from 1905, and from 1911 at the University of Bologna. From 1925 he taught at the University of Florence, from which he was dismissed under the Italian racial laws of 18 November 1938. From 1930 until 1938 he was a member of the Accademia dei Lincei.

Cammeo drew up the laws of the new Vatican State in 1932.

== Works ==
- Questioni di diritto amministrativo, 1900
- Le manifestazioni di volontà dello Stato, 1901
- Commentario delle leggi sulla giustizia amministrativa, 1910
- I vizi di errore, dolo e violenza negli atti amministrativi, 1913
- Il Corso di diritto amministrativo, 1914
- I contratti della pubblica amministrazione, 1937
