= Death of a Princess =

1980 British drama-documentary film by Antony Thomas

- Genre: Docudrama
- Written by: Antony Thomas
- Directed by: Antony Thomas
- Starring: Sawsan Badr; Paul Freeman; Judy Parfitt
- Theme music composer: Vangelis
- Country of origin: United Kingdom
- Original languages: English; Arabic

Production
- Producers: ATV; WGBH

Original release
- Network: ITV (UK); PBS (US)
- Release: 9 April 1980

Death of a Princess (Arabic: موت أميرة) is a British 1980 drama-documentary produced by ATV in cooperation with WGBH in the United States. The drama is based on the case of Princess Mishaal, a young Saudi Arabian princess who was executed along with her lover for adultery in 1977. The film's dramatized and fictionalized depiction of the executions and Saudi Arabian customs led to an uproar; its broadcast was protested by Middle Eastern governments and resulted the disruption of diplomatic relations and trade between western and Arab states.

== Form ==
The film was based on numerous interviews by journalist Antony Thomas, who, upon first hearing the story, grew passionately curious about its veracity, soon drawing upon contacts in the Arab world for their insights and opinions. Because of the candid and sometimes critical nature of the interviews, Thomas and ATV executives decided not to make the film as a straight documentary but instead to dramatise it with actors.

Thomas was played by Paul Freeman under the name "Christopher Ryder". The identities of the interviewees were obscured, and the actors chosen to replace them were based only loosely on their subjects. The character of Elsa Gruber, played by Judy Parfitt, was based on Rosemarie Buschow, a German woman who had worked for the Saudi royal family as a nanny.

There was only one exception, an Arab family who played themselves. The fictitious nation in which the drama was set was called "Arabia", which some viewers took to mean Saudi Arabia. The name of the princess was never said.

Death of a Princess depicts Thomas' focus on "the Princess", as her story became his vehicle through which important facets of Islamic culture in Saudi Arabia were revealed, including traditions and customs as well as gender roles and sexuality. Thomas later explained that he had only reconstructed scenes where he was confident that they did happen, although he included film of interviewees telling him information which he did not believe. The airport scene where the princess was caught was filmed in Jeddah Airport.

== Controversy ==
A critically acclaimed film shown on ITV in the United Kingdom on 9 April 1980, it provoked an angry response from the Saudi government. While resisting pressure not to show the film, ATV agreed to include an introductory comment that said:

The programme you are about to see is a dramatized reconstruction of certain events which took place in the Arab world between 1976 and 1978. We have been asked to point out that equality for all before the law is regarded as paramount in the Moslem world.

The British ambassador to Riyadh, James Craig, was asked to leave the country, while restrictions were placed on the issuing of visas to British businessmen. Saudi Arabia, along with Lebanon, banned British Airways' Concorde from its airspace, making its flights between London and Singapore unprofitable. While the Saudi response had initially driven a UK press reaction against the attempted censorship, when export orders began to be cancelled, the press began to question whether it had been right to show the film. British Foreign Secretary Lord Carrington found the film "deeply offensive", he "wished it had never been shown", but "to ban a film because we do not like it or even because it hurts our friends" was not an option for the country's government.

Similarly, the US government received enormous political pressure from Saudi Arabia to censor its broadcast. On 8 May 1980, Mobil Oil placed an advertisement in The New York Times and other newspapers condemning the film, which it described as "a new fairy tale". It quoted a letter to the New Statesman by Penelope Mortimer, who had worked with Thomas on the film:

With the exception of Barry Millner, who had already sold his story to the Daily Express, Rosemary [sic] Buschow, and the Palestinian family in Beirut, every interview and every character in the film is fabricated. The "revelation" of the domestic lives of the Saudi princesses—man-hunting in the desert, rendezvous in boutiques—was taken entirely on the evidence of an expatriate divorcée, as was the story of the princess first seeing her lover on Saudi television. No real effort was made to check up on such information. Rumour and opinion somehow came to be presented as fact... the audience, foolishly believing it to be authentic, is conned.

While Buschow had advised Thomas on the making of the film, she later told the Associated Press that it should not have been made, adding that "it achieved nothing but discord... every family has a black sheep, and this is a large family of around 5,000 people".

After some stalling, it was eventually broadcast by the PBS programme World in most of the US on 12 May 1980, with only 16 out of 200 PBS stations choosing not do so. In one example, South Carolina Educational Television canceled the broadcast of the film across its network, a decision influenced by fact that the then-U.S. ambassador to Saudi Arabia, John C. West, had formerly been the state's Governor. Among the other PBS stations chose not to air the film were KUHT in Houston, Texas, KLCS in Los Angeles, California, & Alabama Public Television Network

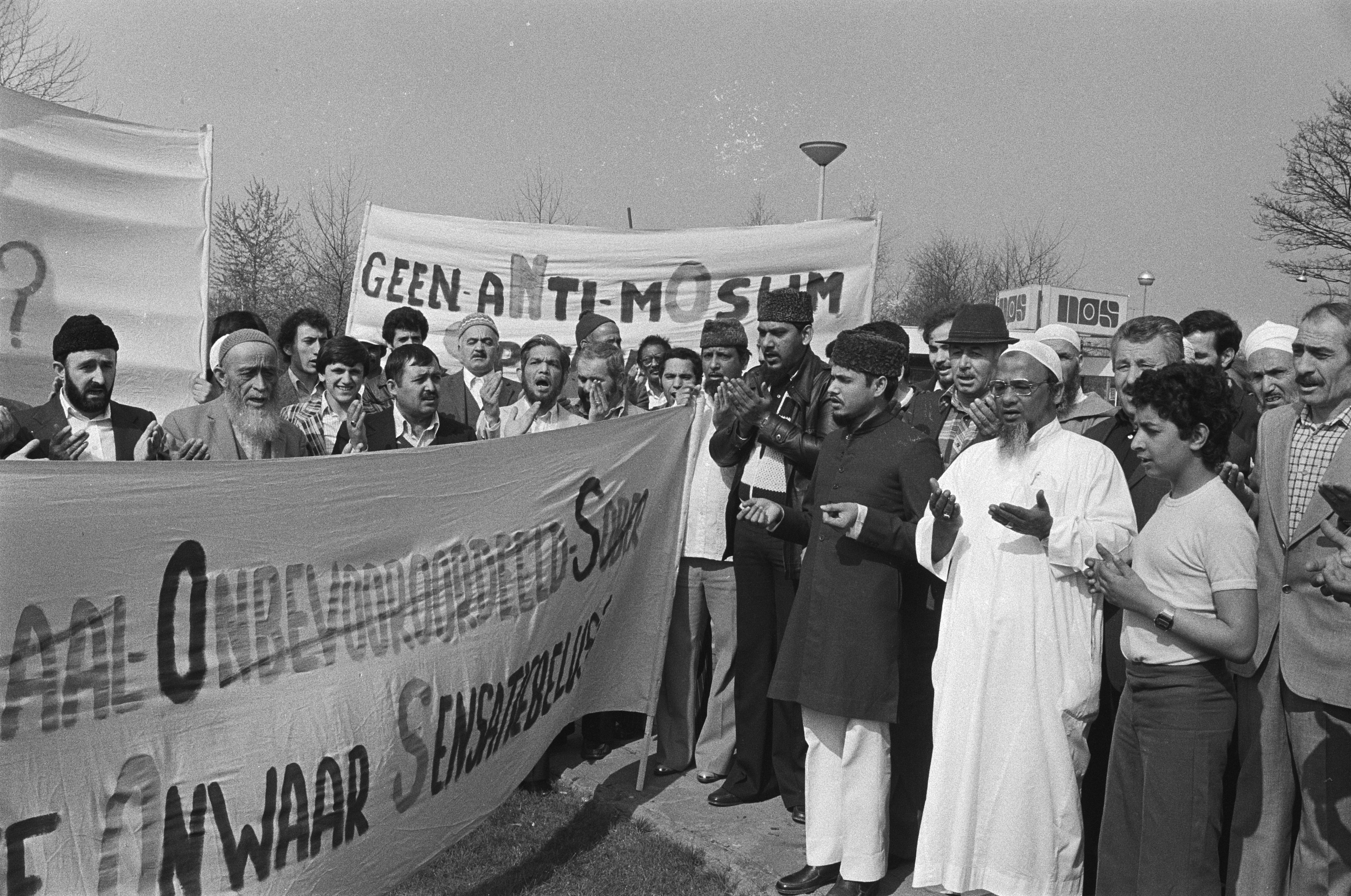
Protests against the film outside NOS in Hilversum, Netherlands.

In the Netherlands, NOS showed the programme, with the broadcaster claiming that there had been "no controversy about it here" and that it had not been contacted by the Saudi Government. This was despite an earlier demonstration by Muslims outside the NOS building in Hilversum. However, in Sweden, the rights were bought, at a premium, by a video company, Scanvideo, which decided that the economy "would suffer great harm if it were shown, and decided that it must not be shown". By contrast, the film was shown in neighbouring Norway by public broadcaster NRK.

In Australia, the programme was shown on the Seven Network, although the acting Prime Minister, Doug Anthony, asked the channel not to show it, as it might jeopardise trade deals with Saudi Arabia and other Middle Eastern countries. He denounced the film as "grossly offensive to the Saudi Arabian Royal Family and government". The Cattlemen's Union of Australia also campaigned against the film being shown, with its executive director arguing that it was "stupid to risk future trade relations, job opportunities and export income for a brief period of sick entertainment". After the screening of the programme, Australian businesses reported delays in obtaining visas for Saudi Arabia as a result.

As a result of playing the role of the Princess, Egyptian actress Suzanne Abou Taleb, according to People magazine, "was put on a blacklist by Egyptian TV, film and theatre producers, who are dependent on Saudi petrodollars". The measure had exactly the opposite of its intended effect, increasing her public prominence and she became one of the most popular actresses in Egypt, under the name Sawsan Badr. Paul Freeman's performance as Christopher Ryder was seen by Steven Spielberg, who noted his piercing eyes; this observation led to his casting as René Belloq in Raiders of the Lost Ark.

In a retrospective interview for the Frontline rebroadcast, Thomas described his reasons for making the film:

I set off to investigate this story with the idea of doing it as a drama, and gradually I realized that something completely different was developing. Where I traveled through the Arab world, the story was celebrated. Everyone had their own version of that story, all very, very different. ... Whoever I spoke to—whether they were Palestinians, whether they were conservative Saudis, whether they were radicals—they attached themselves to this princess. She'd become a myth. And they identified with her, and they kind of co-opted her to their cause. People were discussing things with me about their private lives, about their sexual feelings, about their political frustrations, that they'd never discussed with me before. ...Somehow this princess was sort of like a catalyst. And after thinking about it seriously, I thought, my gosh, this is perhaps an even more interesting story to tell.

In Edward Said's book Covering Islam, he discusses the release of Death of Princess and the Saudi response. He argues that although the Saudis opposed the showing of the film and used their money to try and coerce PBS from televising it, they lacked the cultural capital that the West had over representation of Muslims in the media. The Saudis opposed it for its implications of Saudi royal family corruption, but also because it only reinforced images of Sharia law that Westerners understand: punishment.

In 2025, The Guardian named it among 70 "unforgettable" shows from the history of ITV, noting that Prime Minister Margaret Thatcher cited it as her least favourite show and adding: "Condemning the show, the Thatcher government seemed to lament that it lacked Middle Eastern censorship powers. That ATV lost its ITV licence in the 1982 reshuffle was officially a coincidence."

The film has never been broadcast again in the UK, although there was a private screening at the British Academy of Film and Television Arts in 2009. It was re-broadcast in the US by Frontline in April 2005, for its 25th anniversary. This was under limited terms described in its original contract, meaning that because of copyright and issues with royalties, it is not available for Internet viewing through PBS.

== In popular culture ==
- Not the Nine O'Clock News made a spoof apology to the Saudis on their television series which was the first track on their eponymous 1980 album.
- The BBC comedy The Young Ones referred to the diplomatic crisis when a character dressed as an Arab sheikh told an aide that he wished to see the British ambassador. The aide replied "Certainly your Highness. Which piece would you like to see first?".
- A 1982 Yes Minister episode ("The Moral Dimension") refers to a diplomatic incident as "the greatest crisis since Death of a Princess".

== See also ==
- The Crown (season 6)
