= Gianluigi Nuzzi =

Italian journalist, writer, and television host (born 1969)

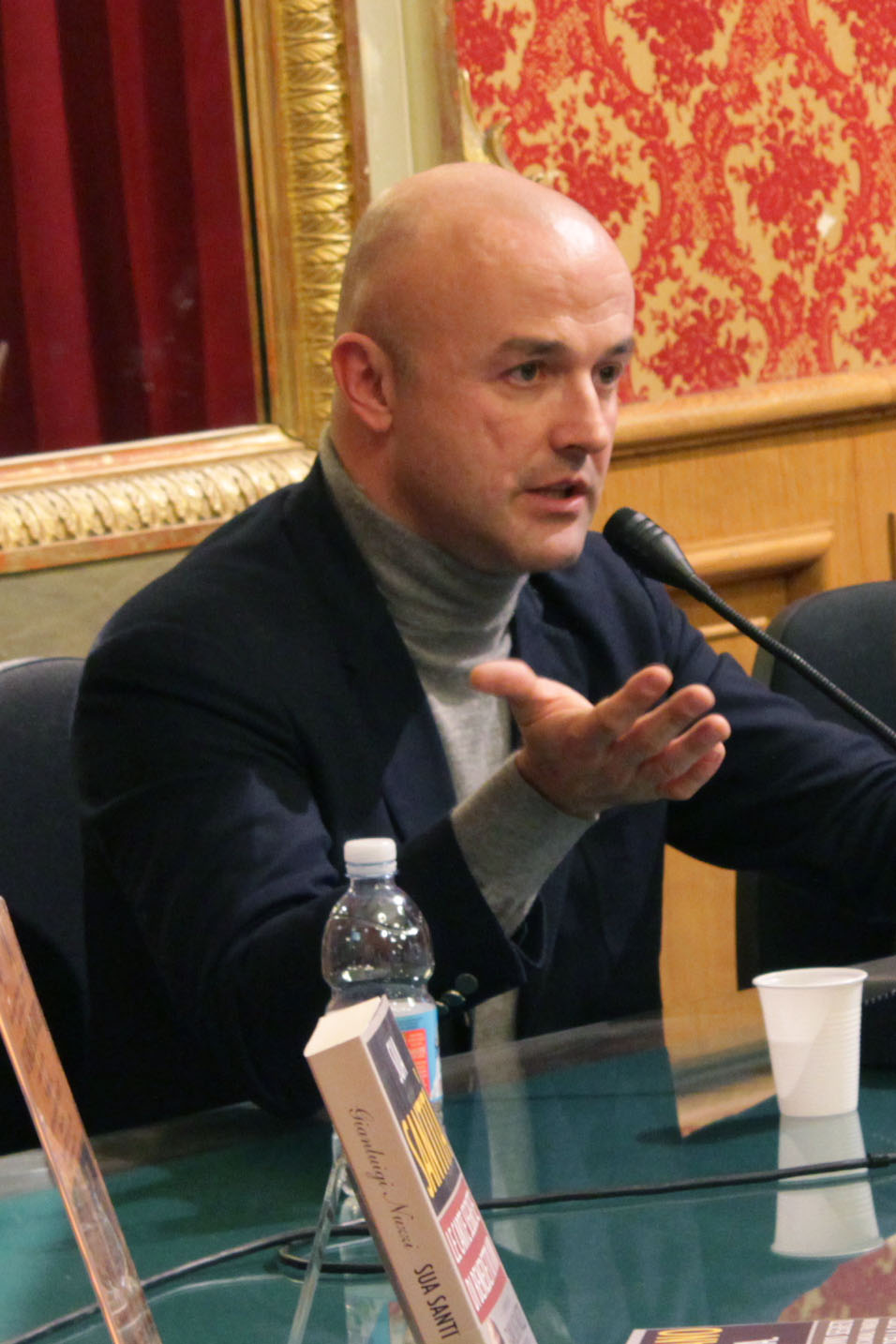
- Gianluigi Nuzzi in 2013
- Born: 3 June 1969 (age 57); Milan
- Occupations: Journalist; Writer; Television host
- Height: 1.76 m (5 ft 9 in)

Gianluigi Nuzzi (born 3 June 1969) is an Italian journalist, writer, and television host. He is the author of His Holiness: The Secret Papers of Benedict XVI. He is a Roman Catholic.

== Biography ==
Nuzzi became a professional journalist on July 29, 1996. He has collaborated with several Italian newspapers and magazines, including Espansione, CorrierEconomia, L'Europeo, Gente Money, and Corriere della Sera. He worked for a long time at Il Giornale and Panorama. Since 1994, he has followed the most relevant Italian judicial investigations. A correspondent for the daily Libero, he studied at the Pascal scientific high school in Milan.
