= James Kavanaugh =

American poet

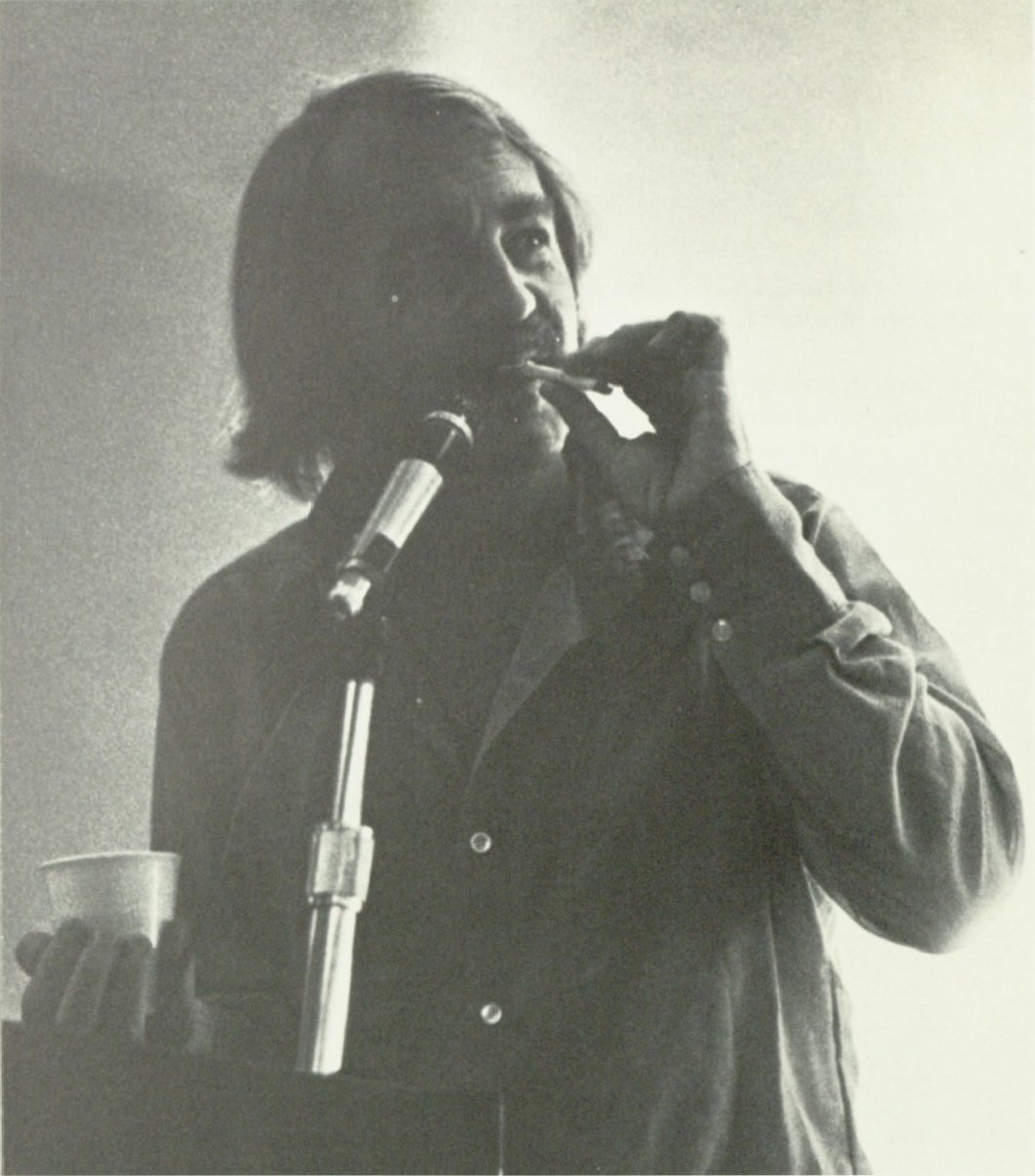
Kavanaugh speaking at the University of San Diego, c. 1972

James Kavanaugh (September 17, 1928 – 29 December 2009) was an American Catholic priest, author, and poet best remembered for his iconoclastic 1967 book A Modern Priest Looks at His Outdated Church, which became a national bestseller. He left the priesthood within a few months of the book's publication.

Born in Kalamazoo, Michigan, and ordained in 1954, Kavanaugh served as a parish priest in Lansing and Flint, Michigan before earning a doctorate at the Catholic University of America in Washington, D.C.

A Nun's Journey is Rene Reid's 2022 memoir of her relationship with James Kavanaugh.
