= Tad Jones (music historian) =

American music historian and researcher

- Born: Thaddeus Bunol Jones; September 19, 1952; New Orleans, Louisiana
- Died: January 1, 2007 (aged 54)
- Education: Loyola University New Orleans
- Occupation: music historian

Thaddeus Bunol "Tad" Jones (September 19, 1952 – January 1, 2007) was an American music historian and researcher. His extensive research is credited with definitively establishing and documenting Louis Armstrong's correct birth date, August 4, 1901.

== Early life, family and education ==
Jones was a native and resident of New Orleans, Louisiana. He developed an interest in the music and history of New Orleans at a young age and conducted important oral history interviews with musicians while still in his teens.

He earned a degree in communications at Loyola University New Orleans.

== Career ==
At Loyola University New Orleans, Jones was the music director of the university's radio station WLDC from 1971 to 1974. Frequently, he merged his broadcasting training with his musical historical expertise to promote New Orleans music in the station's playlist. This, in turn, gained the attention of and influenced the programming of numerous record companies and album-oriented rock and jazz broadcast outlets throughout the US. Jones also used WLDC's recording facilities in pioneering the taped oral history interviews of numerous New Orleans musicians from every period and style of New Orleans music. The William Ransom Hogan Jazz Archive at Tulane University now houses many of the interviews.

Jones contributed significantly to fostering and researching American rhythm and blues, early rock and roll and jazz. He was one of the "Fabulous Fo'teen," the founding members of Tipitina's, New Orleans's landmark music club established in 1977 and dedicated to Professor Longhair as a place for Longhair to perform until his death in 1980. Jones co-authored the liner notes of Longhair's final original records, "Crawfish Fiesta." He was involved in the founding of New Orleans community radio station WWOZ-FM. He was also involved in the organization of "Piano Night," a celebration of piano originally presented at Tipitina's on the Monday following the first weekend of the New Orleans Jazz and Heritage Festival as a benefit for the radio station.

Jones taught a popular and acclaimed course on the history of New Orleans rhythm and blues at the University of New Orleans in the late 1980s. He also managed music publishing for The Radiators as General Manager of the band's Fishhead Music. He served as an original program organizer of New Orleans's Satchmo SummerFest, the city's annual conference and celebration of Louis Armstrong's birthday, which draws a choice roster of scholars and fans to New Orleans. Additionally, Jones served as a consultant for multiple documentaries and films. With Jason Berry and Johnathan Foose, Jones co-authored Up from the Cradle of Jazz (2009, ISBN 978-0-8203-0853-1), a history of post-World War II New Orleans rhythm and blues.

At his death, Jones was researching and writing a long-anticipated biography of the early life of Louis Armstrong. The book was said to be near completion when Jones died.

== Personal life and demise ==
Jones died unexpectedly on January 1, 2007, after an accidental fall outside his Uptown New Orleans home. He was interred in Metairie Cemetery following a jazz funeral organized by New Orleans musicians. The funeral reflected the city's musical traditions and included performances by local musicians. His death was subsequently noted in accounts of the New Orleans music community.
