= Piero Antonio Bonnet =

Italian jurist

Piero Antonio Bonnet (Comacchio, 2 August 1940 – Rome, 18 February 2018) was an Italian jurist and the iudex unicus of the Vatican City State.

== Biography ==
From 1947 to 1953, he studied at the Nobile Collegio Mondragone run by the Jesuits in Frascati.

After teaching the Faculty of Jurisprudence at the University of Modena, he took up important tasks at the University of Teramo where he was president of the Faculty of Jurisprudence, prorector, and director of the school of specialization for the juridical disciplines, director of the department of juridical sciences in society and in history, and a member of the academic senate. He also taught at the Pontifical Lateran University and the Pontifical Gregorian University.

On 20 May 2009 he was appointed by Pope Benedict XVI as the iudex unicus of the Vatican City State, replacing the deceased Gianluigi Marrone.
