= List of flags of the Papacy =

The following is a list of flags used in Vatican City and for its predecessor, the Papal States.

== National flag and State flag ==
Flag	Date	Description
	7 June 1929 – 1 February 2001	Two fields divided vertically, yellow field on the staff side and a white field on the fly side, which bears the tiara and the keys.
	1 February 2001 – 7 June 2023	Two fields divided vertically, yellow field on the staff side and a white field on the fly side, which bears the tiara and the keys.
	7 June 2023 – present	Two fields divided vertically, yellow field on the staff side and a white field on the fly side, which bears the tiara and the keys.

== Papal flags ==
=== Papal standard ===
Flag	Date	Description
	1523–1534	Orange and red stripes charged with the coat of arms of Pope Clement VII.
	2005–2013	Two fields divided vertically, yellow field on the staff side and a white field on the fly side, which bears Pope Benedict's personal arms.
	2013–2023	Two fields divided vertically, yellow field on the staff side and a white field on the fly side, which bears Pope Francis's personal arms.
	2023–2025	Two fields divided vertically, yellow field on the staff side and a white field on the fly side, which bears Pope Francis's personal arms.
	2025–	Two fields divided vertically, yellow field on the staff side and a white field on the fly side, which bears Pope Leo's personal arms.

=== Papal pennant ===
Flag	Date	Description
	2005–2013	With a yellow band at the hoist and Pope Benedict's personal arms in color in the white fly.
	2013–2023	With a yellow band at the hoist and Pope Francis's personal arms in color in the white fly.
	2023–2025	With a yellow band at the hoist and Pope Francis's personal arms in color in the white fly.
	2025–	With a yellow band at the hoist and Pope Leo's personal arms in color in the white fly.

=== Papal banners ===
Flag	Date	Description
	1922–1939	Papal banner of Pope Pius XI
	1939–1958	Papal banner of Pope Pius XII
	1958–1963	Papal banner of Pope John XXIII
	1963–1978	Papal banner of Pope Paul VI
	1978–2005	Papal banner of Pope John Paul II
	2005–2013	Papal banner of Pope Benedict XVI
	2013–2025	Papal banner of Pope Francis
	2025–	Papal banner of Pope Leo XIV

== Military flag ==
Flag	Date	Description
	1978–1982	Papal guard flag of 1914, but with the arms of Pope John Paul II and Commandant Franz Pfyffer von Altishofen
	2002–2005	Papal guard flag of 1914, but with the arms of Pope John Paul II and Commandant Elmar Mäder
	2005–2008	Papal guard flag of 1914, but with the arms of Pope Benedict XVI and Commandant Elmar Mäder
	2008–2013	Papal guard flag of 1914, but with the arms of Benedict XVI and Commandant Daniel Anrig
	2013–2015	Papal guard flag of 1914, but with the arms of Pope Francis and Commandant Daniel Anrig
	2015–2025	Papal guard flag of 1914, but with the arms of Pope Francis and Commandant Christoph Graf
	2025–	Papal guard flag of 1914, but with the arms of Pope Leo XIV and Commandant Christoph Graf

== Historical flags ==
Flag	Date	Use	Description
		Papal naval ensign	White flag with a version of the coat of arms of the Holy See between the figures of Saint Peter and Saint Paul.
	1300s	Banner of Pope Boniface VIII	A red swallowtail with two golden keys crossed over an umbraculum of the same colour.
	1510s	Banner of Pope Leo X	An orange swallowtail with seven red roundels.
	1520s		An orange swallowtail featuring two crossed keys on a white shield.
	1520s	Flag used by papal military strategist Jacopo Pesaro	
	1540s	Banner of Pope Paul III	Dark red swallowtail with the keys and tiara design.
	1669–1771	Flag for Papal Ships	A red flag with Christ on the cross, surrounded by St. Peter and St. Paul.
	1808–1870	Pilot flag, Infantry colours and de-facto civil flag	Vertical yellow and white bicolour.
	–1870	War and proto-national flag flown over Porta Pia during the fall of Rome (1870)	Yellow and white, with simplified coat of arms of the Holy see in the middle
	1803–1825	Flag for Papal Merchant Ships	A white banner with the keys and tiara in the centre.
	1849	Flag of the Roman Republic	The Italian tricolour with the phrase DIO E POPOLO (God and People) in the centre.
	1825–1870	Flag for Papal Merchant Ships	Vertical yellow and white bicolour with the tiara and keys in the center of the white half.

== See also ==
- Flag of Vatican City
- Coat of arms of Vatican City
- History of Christian flags
