= Vatican murders =

1998 double murder in Vatican City

- Location: Vatican City
- Date: 4 May 1998; 28 years ago 9 p.m. (UTC+2)
- Attack type: Shooting, murder–suicide
- Weapon: SIG Sauer P220
- Deaths: 3 (including the perpetrator)
- Victims: Alois Estermann and Gladys Meza Romero
- Perpetrator: Cédric Tornay
- Motive: Personal grievance

The Vatican murders occurred on 4 May 1998, when Swiss Guard lance corporal Cédric Tornay, using his service pistol, shot and killed the commander of the Swiss Guard, Alois Estermann, and Estermann's wife, Gladys Meza Romero, in Vatican City, before killing himself. The murder happened the same day that Estermann was confirmed in his position as commander, after a period of being acting commander.

Estermann, as the acting commander of the guard, had disciplined Tornay for infractions; as a result, he rejected Tornay for the Benemerenti medal, which Swiss Guards usually receive. Prior to the crime, Tornay wrote a suicide note to his family complaining about Estermann and the supposed injustices he had inflicted against him. The case shocked the Vatican and initiated a media frenzy. The murders spawned various conspiracy theories that questioned the official narrative, though none has ever been substantiated.

== Background ==
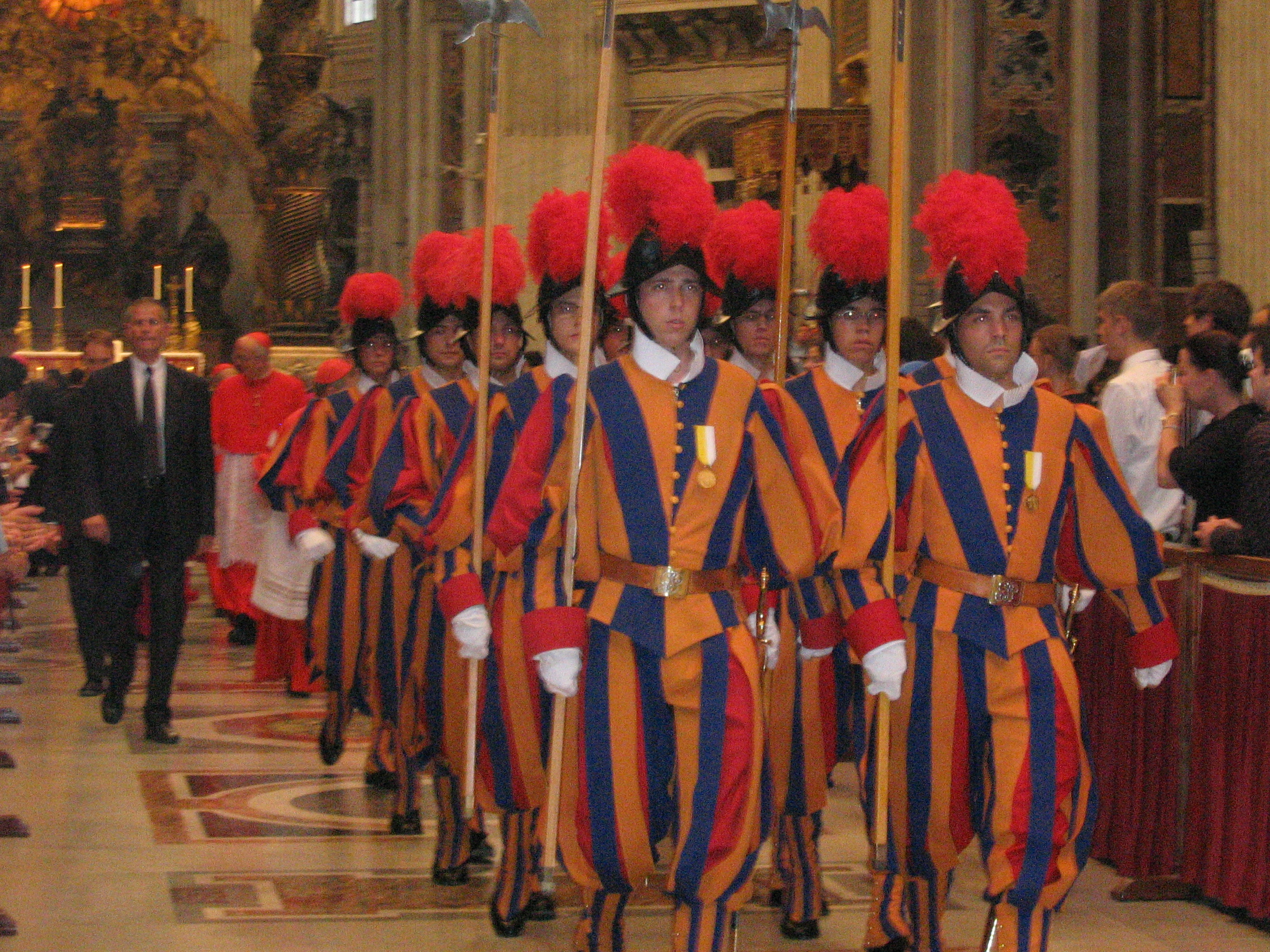
Group of Swiss Guards, pictured 2006

The Swiss Guard are the pope's bodyguards, and the smallest army in the world, numbering about 100 men. In early 1998, Roland Buchs, the commander of the Swiss Guard, retired. The Holy See took five months to replace him, with the eventual selection of 43-year-old Swiss lieutenant colonel Alois Estermann, initially as acting commandant. In 1981, Estermann had been one of the bodyguards guarding the popemobile when Pope John Paul II was shot in an assassination attempt. Estermann was married to Gladys Meza Romero, a Venezuelan former model and former policewoman. After marrying Estermann, she worked for the Venezuelan Embassy in Rome as an archivist. Romero and Estermann were a popular pair in diplomatic circles there, often seen at diplomatic receptions. Both were pious and regularly attended Mass.

Cédric Tornay, a 23-year-old lance corporal, came from Saint-Maurice in Valais, Switzerland. He was a non-commissioned officer of the guard. Roland Buchs, who knew Tornay personally, described him as an idealist and as someone who was "sensitive to the way other people treated him". The final report described him as dually "uninhibited and disrespectful" but also "polite and kind". According to the report he regularly used marijuana, and an autopsy found a cyst in his brain "the size of a pigeon egg".

In February 1998, Estermann disciplined Tornay for a regulatory infraction after Tornay spent the night outside Vatican City without permission. Citing this as his rationale, he rejected Tornay for the Benemerenti Medal, which is usually automatically given to Swiss Guards after three years of service. This denial occurred two days before Tornay would have received the medal, and Tornay may have only stayed in the Guards for as long as he did in order to receive it. On 4 May 1998, Estermann was officially made commander of the Guard.

== Murders ==
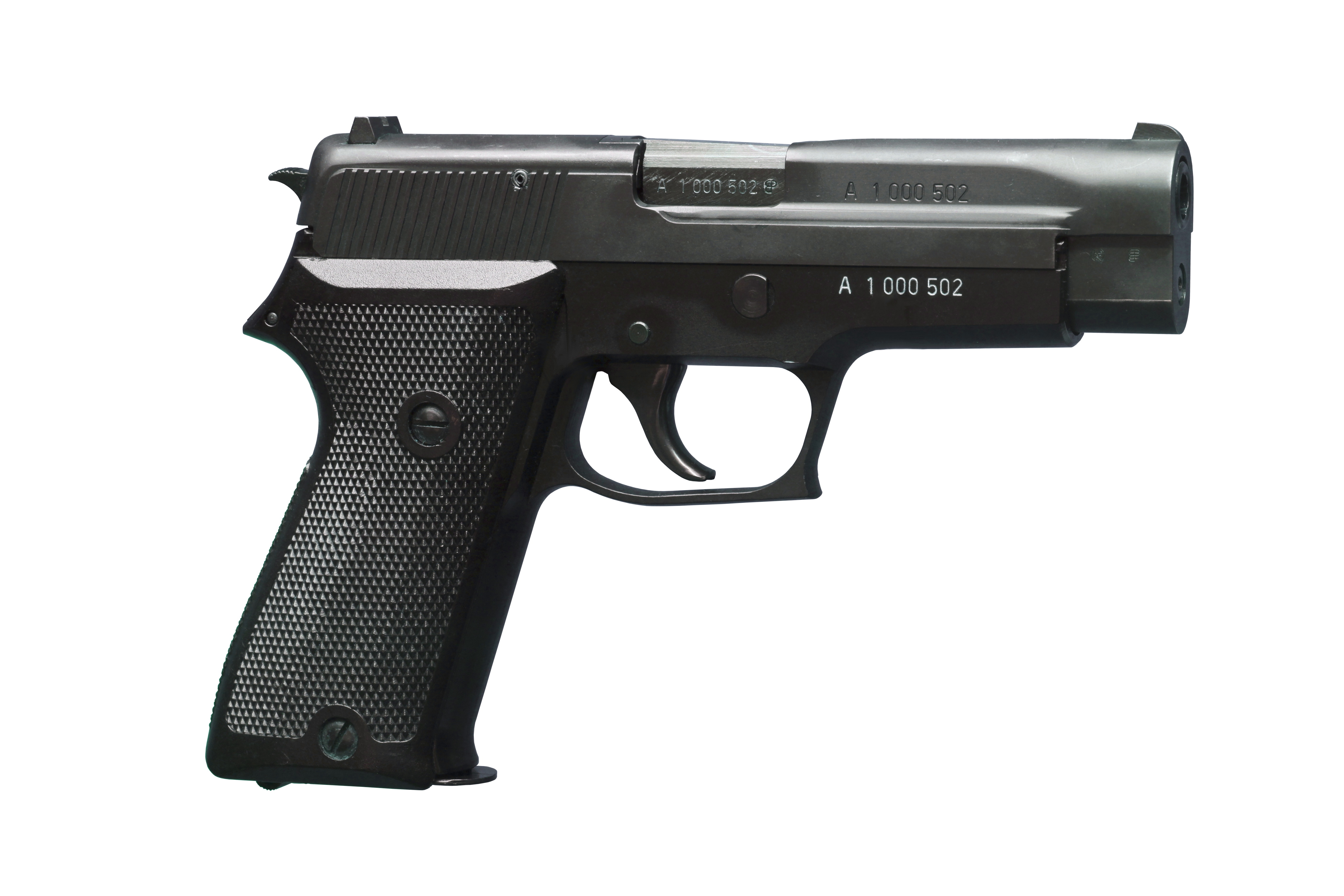
A SIG Sauer P220, the service pistol of the Swiss Guard, was the weapon used in the murders.

At 9 p.m. on 4 May 1998, only a few hours after Estermann was confirmed in his position as commander of the Guard, Tornay went to Estermann's apartment in the barracks in Vatican City. The apartment was located close to the Porta Sant'Anna, with the entrance to the Vatican behind it.

According to the investigation report, Romero and then Estermann had talked with a friend on the phone at 8:46 p.m. While Estermann was still on the phone, Romero opened the door to Tornay. Tornay proceeded to rush toward Estermann, shooting him twice with his SIG Sauer P220 9mm service pistol, hitting Estermann's shoulder and left cheek, killing him. Tornay then turned and shot at Romero, initially missing (the bullet went through the door, and lodged in the lift door on the landing) before shooting and killing her with a fourth shot. He then knelt and shot himself through the roof of his mouth.

Noise and shouts were heard briefly from the apartment. Anna-Lina Meier, a nun who did some of her work in the Swiss barracks there, went to Estermann's apartment to investigate. Finding the door open, she saw Romero's body, and not wanting to go any further by herself found lance corporal Marcel Riedi, who entered the apartment and found all three bodies. Tornay was found with the pistol underneath him. Shortly afterwards, Alois Jehle, the chaplain of the Swiss Guards, informed the pope's private secretary Stanisław Dziwisz.

Prior to the murders, Tornay wrote a suicide note to his mother. In this note he complained of numerous grievances, which he called "injustices", perpetrated by Estermann, calling him unfair and harsh. Additionally, he complained of tensions between the German- and French-speaking Swiss guard members. It is unclear to what extent these complaints reflected reality. In this note he wrote of the medal rejection, stating that: "After three years, six months and three days of enduring all the injustices here, they denied me the one thing I wanted." However, his bitterness in the note was generalized and directed not only towards Estermann.

== Aftermath ==
The case shocked the Vatican and initiated a media frenzy worldwide, especially in Italy. The author Robert Royal called it "one of the most shocking events in the entire history of the Swiss Guard". Violent acts like this were unheard of in Vatican City. (Note: A papal gentleman had, however, been murdered several months before, probably by a male prostitute. This however happened outside of the Vatican, in his home.) Due to Vatican City's low population, this singular instance of double homicide gave the country the highest annual murder rate in the world in 1998, at over 200 per 100,000 people, far above any other country. In 1999 the rate was 0 per 100,000 (there were no murders).

Tornay's status as the perpetrator and his presumed motive were announced a few hours later. Joaquín Navarro-Valls attributed the murders to Tornay's "peculiar" psychology and his resentment towards Estermann. He stated that "the information that has emerged so far suggest vice-corporal Cédric Tornay suffered a sudden fit of madness". Swiss President Flavio Cotti expressed "the sincere sympathy of the government and the entire Swiss population". A mass was held for the Estermanns in St. Peter's Basilica, the first time this had been done for someone who was not a member of the clergy. John Paul II prayed for them. Tornay's funeral was held in his hometown of Saint-Maurice.

The state of the Swiss Guard generally was criticized in the aftermath, with service portrayed as "stressful, difficult, and poorly paid". The murders took place only two days before the swearing-in of the new Swiss Guard officers on 6 May. In the aftermath, Buchs temporarily came out of retirement while the Vatican looked for a replacement. Estermann was eventually replaced by Pius Segmüller. The Cardinal Secretary of State, Angelo Sodano, said that of the events, "Dear officers of the Holy See, the pope renews his trust and his gratitude. The black cloud of one day cannot obscure more than five hundred years of service." In investigating, the Vatican refused technical assistance from the Italian police. Two autopsies were conducted by two legal professionals working under strict confidentiality agreements. The investigation was headed by a judge who worked both as a personnel manager for the Italian parliament and for the Vatican; this led to some criticism over a perceived lack of experience in leading criminal inquiries. Nine months after the murders, the official investigation was closed 5 February 1999.

Three days later, on 8 February, the examining magistrate of the Vatican, Gianluigi Marrone, released a 10-page final report on the deaths. It said that drugs and mental illness were likely related to Tornay's actions, and that he was solely responsible. Traces of cannabis were found in Tornay's body during the autopsy, in addition to the cyst in his brain, which they said may have impaired his reasoning. It found no indication of any other perpetrators. The report was criticized as "very thin", and the names of all witnesses were censored; this made it difficult for journalists to perform their own investigations to counter the report.

=== Conspiracy theories ===
The media, along with several "Vatican watchers", promoted a variety of conspiracy theories and speculations about the events. The Italian press was especially conspiratorial; a correspondent for the Swiss newspaper Neue Zürcher Zeitung said of the Italian press response that it was almost comparable to the media response to the death of Diana, Princess of Wales. These narratives were popular in the tabloid press and other media, and several investigative journalists wrote books trying to substantiate them, but no proof of them has ever been put forward. Politics professor David Alvarez said of such theories that "such claims either remain unsubstantiated or have been thoroughly discredited". Historian Yvonnick Denoël was more sympathetic to the theories, saying of the affair that though it could not be completely certain that Tornay had done so, he had the relevant motive and precursors for such an act; however, he stated of the case that the way the investigation had been conducted "ensured the truth would never be discovered."

One of these theories was that Tornay and Estermann were gay lovers and that the murder happened after their relationship went bad, with Romero being killed by chance. Another was that Romero and Tornay had been the ones having the affair leading to the murders. Yet another propounded that, since Estermann had been present at the 1981 assassination attempt of John Paul II, and the perpetrator Mehmet Ali Ağca had some assistance from communists, Estermann was therefore an agent (codenamed Werder) of the East German Stasi and was killed due to intelligence services. In opposition, some writers argued that Estermann had some kind of affiliation with the Opus Dei. In these two theories, Tornay is said to have found out about Estermann's allegiance and felt he had to kill him for the church to prevent him from becoming commandant. Other theories involved espionage, exorcists, the Legionaries of Christ and the Bulgarian Secret Service. The 2002 book Assassinati in Vaticano (transl. Murdered in the Vatican) by Vergès and Luc Brossollet argues that all the victims were assassinated and the scene was staged to look like a murder–suicide.

Tornay's relatives rejected the theory that he had been angry with Estermann. His mother Muguette Baudat believed her son was innocent and subject to a plot, claiming various inconsistencies in the evidence and investigation. She hired Jacques Vergès as their family lawyer; Vergès was a notorious high-profile French lawyer, known for defending international terrorists, Nazi leaders, and Serbian president Slobodan Milošević. This obscured whatever possible truth there was to Tornay's claims. A 2009 attempt to reopen the case in Switzerland failed, as the crime had not been committed in Switzerland, and the Vatican also rejected it saying there was no evidence. The investigation and findings were criticized for their secrecy, with an attempt to access related records in 2019 being denied.

In 2021, the Cardinal Secretary of State intervened in the case, and gave Baudat's lawyer Laura Sgro access to the court file. Sgro published a book the following year using the information from the court file, called Sangue in Vaticano (transl. Blood in the Vatican). In her book, she criticized the investigation for being superficial and sloppy, and for immediately settling on Tornay as a perpetrator without properly analyzing the scene. Sgro sent this book to Pope Francis and complained to the United Nations Human Rights Council. Robert Royal said that the "much simpler and far less lurid" reality was that Tornay had simply "snapped". Roland Buchs said of him at his funeral that "His act remains mysterious. Who can understand his last gesture? At this tragic time, many 'whys' and 'wherefores' remain in suspense. Only God knows the answers to our questions." John Paul II said at his funeral that Tornay was to be judged by God, "to whose mercy I entrust him".
