= List of commanders of the Swiss Guard =

Head of the military of Vatican City

Commander of the Pontifical Swiss Guard
- German: Kommandant der Päpstlichen Schweizergarde; French: Commandant de la Garde Suisse Pontificale; Italian: Comandante della Guardia Svizzera Pontificia; Latin: Praefecti Pontificalis Custodiae Helveticae; Romansh: Comandant da la Guardia Svizra Papala
- Flag of the Pontifical Swiss Guard with commander Christoph Graf's emblem

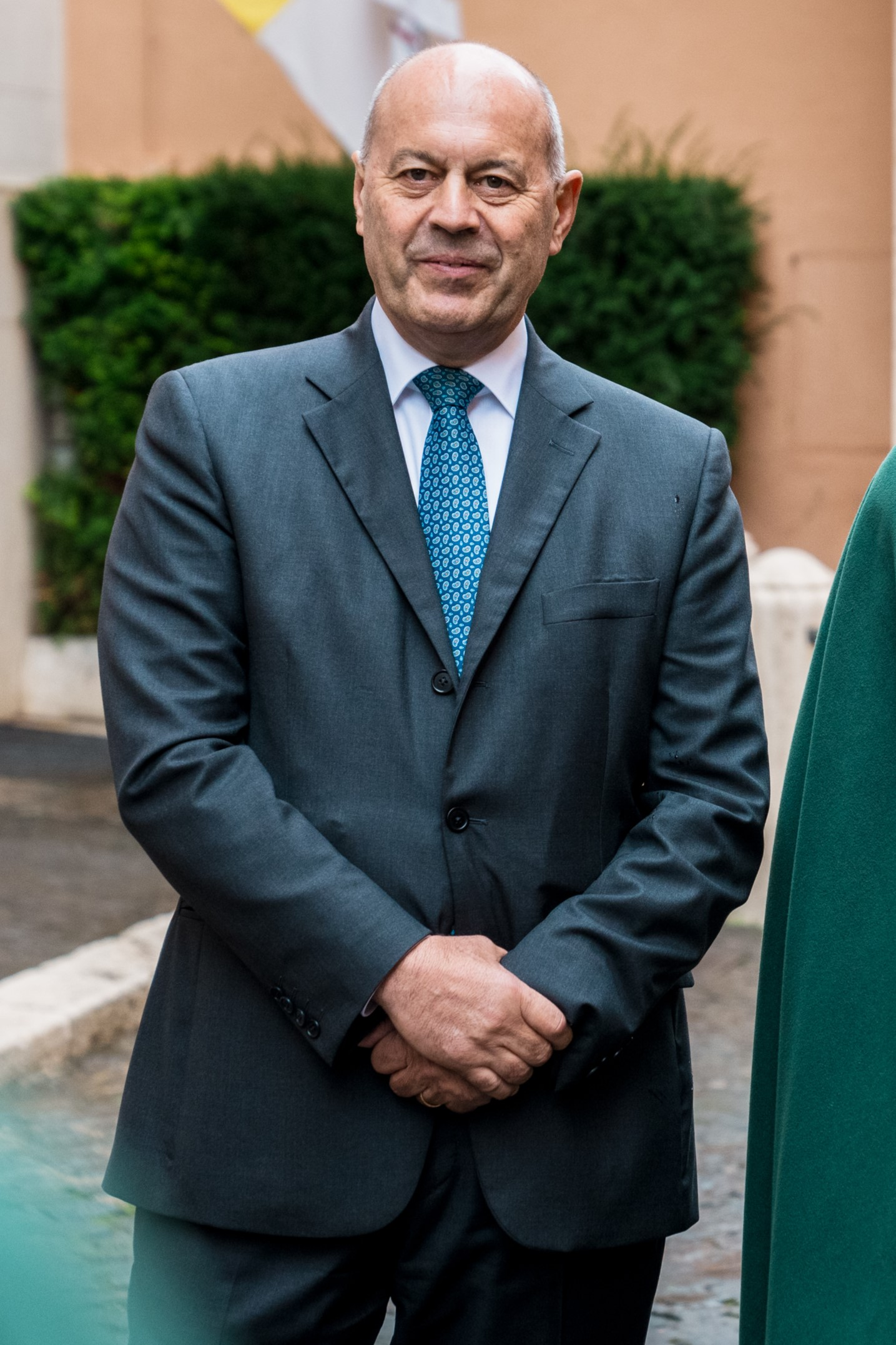
- Incumbent; Christoph Graf since 7 February 2015
- Member of: The Pontifical Swiss Guard
- Reports to: The Pope
- Residence: Vatican City
- Formation: 22 January 1506 (520 years ago)
- First holder: Kaspar von Silenen
- Deputy: Loïc Marc Rossier

The Commander of the Pontifical Swiss Guard is the head of the Pontifical Swiss Guard. In total, there have been 35 commanders of the Swiss Guard serving 51 popes, with interruptions during 1527–1548 following the Sack of Rome, in 1564/5, in 1704–1712 and in 1798/9 following the French invasion. 24 out of 35 commanders were citizens of the city of Lucerne (not counting the incumbent, Christoph Graf, who is from Pfaffnau in the canton of Lucerne). During 1652–1847 the office became quasi-heritable, with ten commanders members of the Pfyffer von Altishofen family of Lucerne. Two commanders were from Zürich, serving during the years of the Swiss Reformation; in modern times, three commanders were from St. Gallen, two from Fribourg, and one each from Solothurn, Grisons and Valais.

== List of commanders ==
List:

No.	Portrait	Commander of the Pontifical Swiss Guard	Took office	Left office	Time in office	Place of origin	Pope
1	Kaspar von Silenen	Kaspar von Silenen (1467–1517)	1506	5 August 1517 †	10–11 years	Silenen, Uri; Luzern	Julius II; Leo X
2	Marx Röist	Marx Röist (1454–1524)	1517	15 June 1524 †	6–7 years	Zürich	Leo X Adrian VI; Clement VII
3	Caspar Röist	Caspar Röist (1478–1527)	1524	6 May 1527 †	2–3 years	Zürich	Clement VII
Guard disbanded (1527–1548)
4	Jost von Meggen [it]	Jost von Meggen (1509–1559)	1548	17 March 1559 †	10–11 years	Luzern	Paul III; Julius III; Marcellus II; Paul IV
5	Kaspar Leo von Silenen	Kaspar Leo von Silenen	1559	1564	4–5 years	Luzern	Pius IV
Guard disbanded (1564–1566)
6	Jost Segesser von Brunegg [it]	Jost Segesser von Brunegg (1529–1592)	1566	1592 †	25–26 years	Luzern	Pius V Gregory XIII; Sixtus V Paul IV; Urban VII; Gregory XIV; Innocent IX; Clement VIII
7	Stephan Alexander Segesser von Brunegg [it]	Stephan Alexander Segesser von Brunegg (1570–1629)	1592	16 August 1629 †	36–37 years	Luzern	Clement VIII; Leo XI; Paul V Gregory XV; Urban VIII
8	Nikolaus Fleckenstein [it]	Nikolaus Fleckenstein (1580–1645)	1629	1640	10–11 years	Luzern	Urban VIII
9	Jost Fleckenstein [it]	Jost Fleckenstein (1588–1652)	1640	26 June 1652 †	11–12 years	Luzern	Urban VIII; Innocent X
10	Johann Rudolf Pfyffer von Altishofen	Johann Rudolf Pfyffer von Altishofen (1615–1657)	1652	17 May 1657 †	4–5 years	Luzern	Innocent X Alexander VII
11	Ludwig Pfyffer von Altishofen	Ludwig Pfyffer von Altishofen (?–1686)	1658	1686 †	27–28 years	Luzern	Alexander VII; Clement IX; Clement X Innocent XI
12	Franz Pfyffer von Altishofen	Franz Pfyffer von Altishofen (?–1696)	1686	1696 †	9–10 years	Luzern	Innocent XI; Alexander VIII; Innocent XII
13	Johann Kaspar Mayr von Baldegg [it]	Johann Kaspar Mayr von Baldegg (1652–1704)	1696	1704 †	7–8 years	Luzern	Innocent XII; Clement XI
-	Johann Rudolf Pfyffer von Altishofen	Johann Rudolf Pfyffer von Altishofen; Acting	1704	1712	7–8 years	Luzern	Clement XI
14	Johann Konrad Pfyffer von Altishofen	Johann Konrad Pfyffer von Altishofen (?–1727)	1712	1727 †	14–15 years	Luzern	Clement XI; Innocent XIII; Benedict XIII
15	Franz Ludwig Pfyffer von Altishofen	Franz Ludwig Pfyffer von Altishofen (?–1772)	1727	1754	26–27 years	Luzern	Benedict XIII; Clement XII; Benedict XIV
16	Jost Ignaz Pfyffer von Altishofen	Jost Ignaz Pfyffer von Altishofen	1754	1782	23–24 years	Luzern	Benedict XIV; Clement XIII; Clement XIV; Pius VI
17	Franz Alois Pfyffer von Altishofen	Franz Alois Pfyffer von Altishofen	1783	1798	14–15 years	Luzern	Pius VI
Post vacant (1798–1800)
18	Karl Leodegar Pfyffer von Altishofen	Karl Leodegar Pfyffer von Altishofen	1800	1834	33–34 years	Luzern	Pius VII; Gregory XVI; Leo XII; Pius VIII
19	Martin Pfyffer von Altishofen	Martin Pfyffer von Altishofen	1835	1847	11–12 years	Luzern	Gregory XVI; Pius IX
20	Franz Xaver Leopold Meyer von Schauensee	Franz Xaver Leopold Meyer von Schauensee (1803–1860)	1847	1860 †	12–13 years	Luzern	Pius IX
21	Alfred von Sonnenberge	Alfred von Sonnenberge	1860	1878	17–18 years	Luzern	Pius IX
22	Louis-Martin de Courten [it]	Louis-Martin de Courten (1835–1937)	1878	1901	22–23 years	Sierre, Valais	Leo XIII
23	Leopold Meyer von Schauensee	Leopold Meyer von Schauensee (1852–1910)	1901	1910 †	8–9 years	Luzern	Leo XIII; Pius X
24	Jules Repond	Jules Repond (1853–1933)	1910	1921	10–11 years	Freiburg	Pius X Benedict XV
25	Alois Hirschbühl	Alois Hirschbühl (1883–1950)	1921	1935	13–14 years	Brusio, Graubünden	Benedict XV; Pius XI
26	Georg von Sury d'Aspremont	Georg von Sury d'Aspremont	1935	1942	6–7 years	Solothurn	Pius XI; Pius XII
27	Heinrich Pfyffer von Altishofen	Heinrich Pfyffer von Altishofen	1942	1957	14–15 years	Luzern	Pius XII
28	Robert Nünlist [it]	Robert Nünlist (1911–1991)	1957	1972	14–15 years	Luzern	Pius XII; John XXIII; Paul VI
29	Franz Pfyffer von Altishofen	Franz Pfyffer von Altishofen (1917–1995)	1972	1982	9–10 years	Luzern	Paul VI; John Paul I John Paul II
30	Roland Buchs [de]	Roland Buchs (1940–2022)	25 November 1982	29 November 1997	15 years, 4 days	Freiburg	John Paul II
-	Alois Estermann	Alois Estermann (1954–1998); Acting	29 November 1997	4 May 1998	156 days	Luzern	John Paul II
31	Alois Estermann	Alois Estermann (1954–1998)	4 May 1998	4 May 1998 †	0 days	Luzern	John Paul II
(30)	Roland Buchs [de]	Roland Buchs (1940–2022); Acting	6 May 1998	16 August 1998	41 days	Freiburg	John Paul II
32	Pius Segmüller	Pius Segmüller (born 1952)	16 August 1998	2002	3–4 years	St. Gallen	John Paul II
33	Elmar Theodor Mäder	Elmar Theodor Mäder (born 1963)	8 November 2002	19 August 2008	5 years	Wuppenau, Thurgau / St. Gallen	John Paul II; Benedict XVI
34	Daniel Rudolf Anrig	Daniel Rudolf Anrig (born 1972)	19 August 2008	31 January 2015	6 years, 165 days	Sargans, St. Gallen	Benedict XVI; Francis
35	Christoph Graf	Christoph Graf (born 1961)	7 February 2015	Incumbent	11 years, 212 days	Pfaffnau, Luzern	Francis; Leo XIV
