= Hirschbühl =

Hirschbühl is a surname. Notable people with the surname include:

- Alois Hirschbühl (1883–1950), Swiss painter and commander of the Pontifical Swiss Guard
- Christian Hirschbühl (born 1990), Austrian alpine ski racer
- Hansjörg Hirschbühl (born 1937), Swiss bobsledder
- Hans-Jörg Hirschbühl (born 1937), Swiss wrestler
