= Jules Repond =

Swiss politician, journalist and lawyer (1853–1933)

Jules Maxime Repond (1853–1933) was a Swiss lawyer and law professor, writer and journalist, politician, entrepreneur and military officer. He served as commander of the Pontifical Swiss Guard for eleven years, during 1910 to 1921.

He was the son of Elie Jean Joseph Repond and Augustine, née Sprenger, of Villarvolard, canton of Fribourg, and elder brother of psychiatrist Paul Repond.

Repond was professor for Roman Law at Fribourg University from 1880. He was elected to the Grand Council of Fribourg as representative of the Gruyère District in 1882. He was editor of Le Bien public, the journal of the liberal-conservative party of Fribourg (1879–1888) and wrote for a number of newspapers including the Gazette de Lausanne. He was president of the Swiss Alpine Club in 1907. He also established the first Raiffeisenbank in the canton of Fribourg. In 1905 he purchased Chenaleyres castle in Autafond. In the Swiss Army, he was promoted to the rank of Colonel brigadier (OF-6) in 1902. As commander of the 3rd Swiss infantry brigade from 1902 to 1908 he was noted for his strict discipline, and especially his opposition to alcohol abuse.

Pope Pius X chose Repond as successor of Leopold Meyer von Schauensee in 1910. During his eleven-year service, Repond was instrumental in developing the Pontifical Swiss Guard into its modern form. He noted that the "Swiss Guards" in the Vatican were mostly "Swiss" only in name, born in Rome to parents of Swiss descent and speaking the Roman Trastevere dialect. He proposed to recruit only native citizens of Switzerland during his command. He re-organized the guard corps, whose service had become a very relaxed position of purely ceremonial nature, introducing rigorous military exercise. He also attempted to introduce modern arms, but Pius X only permitted the presence of firearms if they were not functional. Repond's reforms and strict discipline were not well received by the corps, culminating in a week of open mutiny in July 1913.

In his project to restore the Swiss Guard to its former prestige, Repond also dedicated himself to the study of historical costume, with the aim of designing a new uniform that would be both reflective of the historical Swiss costume of the 16th century and suited for military exercise. The result of his studies was published as Le costume de la Garde suisse pontificale et la Renaissance italienne (1917). Repond designed the distinctive Renaissance-style uniforms still worn by the modern Swiss Guard. The new uniforms were completed in May 1914. Repond also designed the modern banner of the Swiss Guard, quartered by a Swiss cross, with the papal coat of arms of the reigning pope in the upper hoist and the Della Rovere coat of arms of Julius II in the lower fly, and a vignette with the commander's coat of arms in the center. Pius X rejected the proposal, and the first such banner was made in 1914, with the della Chieasa coat of arms of Benedict XV.

After his retirement from service in 1921, Repond dedicated himself to the study of archaeology, especially on the topic of clothing in the ancient world. His monograph on the topic, Les secrets de la draperie antique was published with the Pontifical Academy of Archaeology in 1931.

Repond was a recipient of the Order of Pope Pius IX and of the Order of St. Gregory the Great.
