= Pius Segmüller =

Swiss politician and former commander of the Swiss Guard

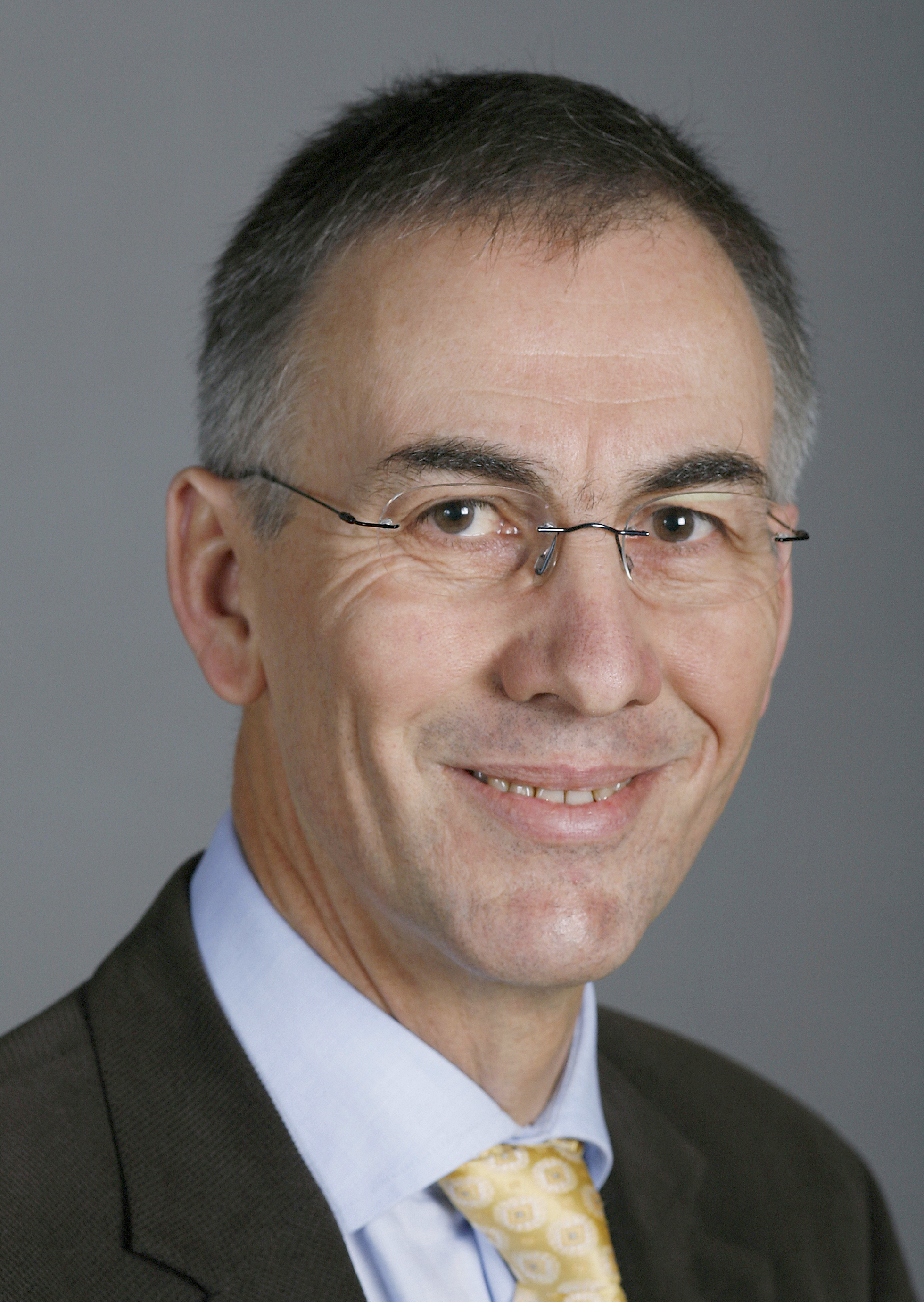

Member of the National Council
- In office 2007–2011

Police Chief of Lucerne
- In office 2002–2006

32nd Commander of the Pontifical Swiss Guard
- In office 1 August 1998 – 2002
- Monarch: John Paul II
- Preceded by: Alois Estermann
- Succeeded by: Elmar Mäder

Personal details
- Born: March 8, 1952 Emmen, Switzerland
- Party: Christian Democratic People's Party of Switzerland
- Children: 2
- Education: University of Zurich; ETH Zurich

Military service
- Allegiance: Switzerland; Vatican City
- Branch/service: Pontifical Swiss Guard; Swiss Army
- Commands: Pontifical Swiss Guard

Pius Segmüller (born 8 March 1952) is a Swiss politician and former commander of the Swiss Guard in the Vatican City (1998-2002). Segmüller was appointed Commander of the Swiss Guard following the death of Alois Estermann.

Segmüller took office on 1 August 1998, nearly three months after the tragic events of May 4, when Commander Alois Estermann, his wife, and a young Swiss Guard from Valais named Cédric Tornay died. He became the 32nd Commander of the Swiss Guard.

Born in Emmen in the canton of Lucerne, Segmüller is originally from Altstätten in the Canton of St. Gallen. He was named an honorary citizen of Randa in the canton of Valais for his service during a local disaster. Prior to his Vatican appointment, he was a practicing Catholic in the parish of Burgdorf in the canton of Bern.

Segmüller studied to become a secondary school teacher at the University of Zurich before attending the military academy at the Federal Polytechnic School of Zurich (1980 and 1985). He also completed staff courses in Bern and at the Swiss Police Institute in Neuchâtel (1995 and 1996). He spent 13 years as a career military officer in rescue troops before returning to civilian status. Before being appointed by Pope John Paul II, he worked at the Bern Canton Security Office as the head of training and disaster response.

A multilingual officer, Segmüller speaks native German, fluent French, and has knowledge of English and Italian. His experience with both German and French-speaking soldiers came from commanding a mixed rescue battalion and later a hospital regiment in Valais. He is married to a Protestant woman and is the father of two children. In an interview following his appointment, Segmüller stated that he viewed his position not merely as a professional challenge but as a vocation aligned with his faith.

In 2002, he was succeeded by Elmar Mäder, who had served as his vice-commander since August 1, 1998, and became head of the police of the city of Lucerne (2002–2006). In October 2007, Segmüller was elected to the Swiss National Council as a member of the Christian Democratic People's Party (CVP/PDC) from the Canton of Lucerne. In 2011 Swiss federal election he was not re-elected. He is currently Director of Security for the International Federation of Association Football (FIFA).

Military offices
Preceded by Alois Estermann	Commander of the Pontifical Swiss Guard; 1998 – 2002	Succeeded by Elmar Mäder
