= Alois Estermann =

Swiss military officer (1954–1998)

- Born: 29 October 1954; Gunzwil, Canton of Lucerne, Switzerland
- Died: 4 May 1998 (aged 43); Vatican City
- Cause of death: Murder
- Spouse: Gladys Meza Romero
- Military career
- Allegiance: Vatican City
- Branch: Swiss Guard

Alois Estermann (29 October 1954 – 4 May 1998) was a Swiss military officer. He served as the 31st Commander of the Pontifical Swiss Guard. Estermann and his wife were murdered in his apartment in Vatican City on 4 May 1998, the same day he was confirmed in his position after serving as acting commander for several months. His murderer, Vice Corporal Cédric Tornay, then killed himself. Estermann's death spawned numerous conspiracy theories.

== Early life and career ==
Estermann was born in Gunzwil, in the Canton of Lucerne, on 29 October 1954. He grew up as a member of a farming family living near Beromünster. In 1975 he graduated with a degree in commerce from a business school in Lucerne.

From 1975 through 1976, Estermann attended the officer training school for the Swiss Army at Thun. He subsequently reached the rank of lieutenant as a Swiss reserve officer. In 1977 Estermann served briefly in the Pontifical Swiss Guard at the Vatican. He then lived in Argentina for two years.

In 1980 he rejoined the Swiss Guard as an officer, thereafter receiving promotions to major (1983) and then to lieutenant colonel (1987).

Estermann was a skilled linguist. In 1981, Estermann had been one of the bodyguards guarding the popemobile when Pope John Paul II was shot in an assassination attempt, where he was photographed. In 1998 he was appointed Commander of the Swiss Guard after Roland Buchs retired in late 1997. His appointment was uncontroversial but it took a long while to be confirmed. Estermann was eventually confirmed 4 May 1998.

== Murder ==
On 4 May 1998, the same day he was confirmed in his position, Estermann and his Venezuelan wife, Gladys Meza Romero, were shot and killed by 23-year-old Swiss Guard Vice Corporal Cédric Tornay. Tornay then killed himself. Tornay had earlier been reprimanded by Estermann for spending a night outside Vatican City without permission, and had been passed over for the Benemerenti medal routinely awarded to Guards after three years of service.

A mass was held for the Estermanns in St. Peter's Basilica, the first time this had been done for someone who was not a member of the clergy. John Paul II prayed for them.

The murder resulted in various conspiracy theories. In a 2011 history of the modern Vatican's military and police forces, Professor David Alvarez, of the Department of Politics at St. Mary's College of California, summarizes the various conspiracy theories before concluding that they "either remain unsubstantiated or have been thoroughly discredited".

Military offices
Preceded by Roland Buchs	Commander of the Pontifical Swiss Guard; 1998	Succeeded by Pius Segmüller
