= Elmar Mäder =

Commander of the Swiss Guard (born 1963)

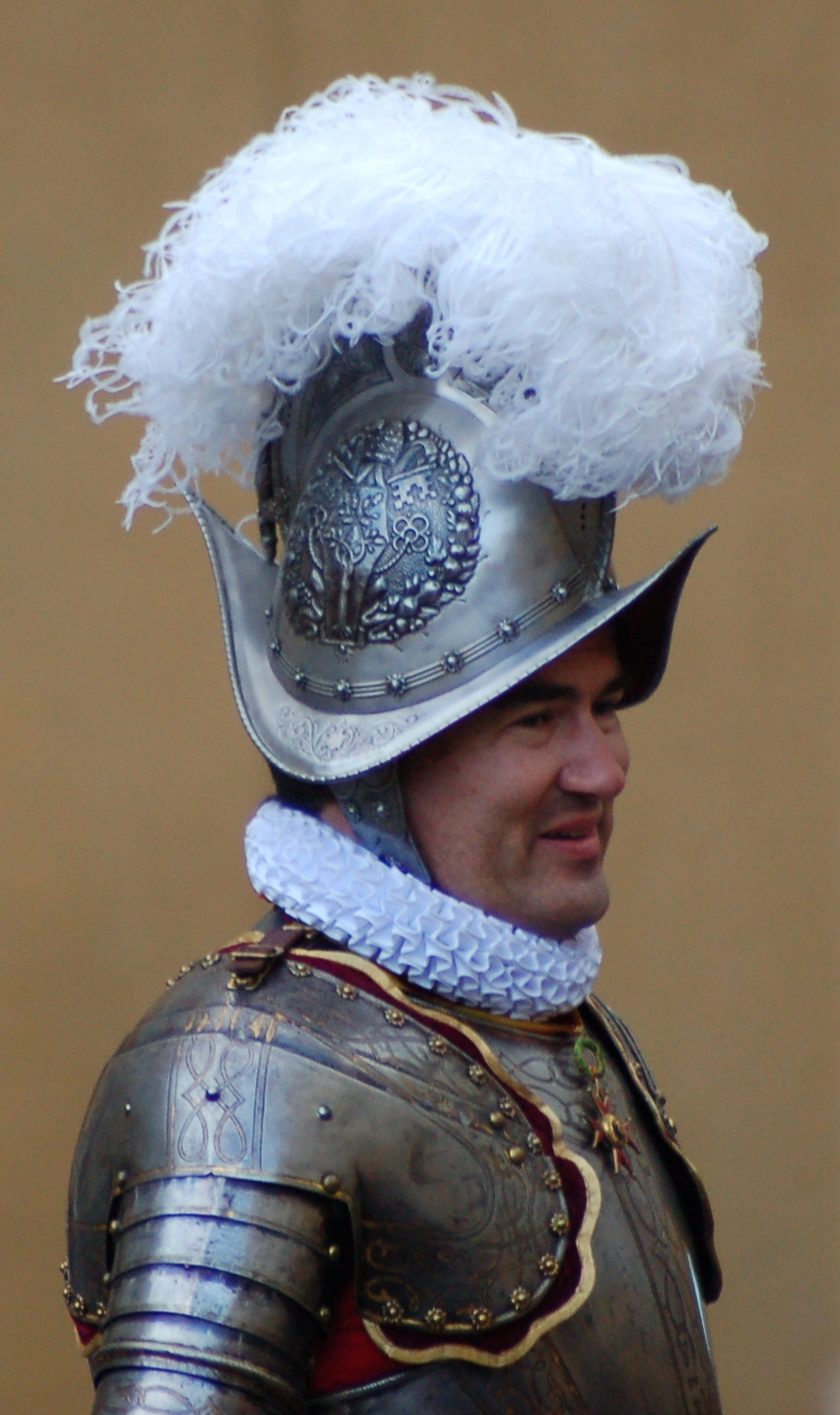
- Mäder in 2008

33rd Commander of the Pontifical Swiss Guard
- In office 8 November 2002 – 19 August 2008
- Monarchs: John Paul II (2002–2005); Benedict XVI (2005–2008)
- Preceded by: Pius Segmüller
- Succeeded by: Daniel Anrig

Personal details
- Born: 28 July 1963 (age 63) Henau, Switzerland
- Spouse: Theresa Clochliger
- Children: 4
- Education: University of St. Gallen; University of Freiburg

Military service
- Allegiance: Vatican City
- Branch/service: Pontifical Swiss Guard; Swiss Army
- Rank: Colonel
- Commands: Pontifical Swiss Guard

Elmar Theodor Mäder (born 28 July 1963) is a Swiss military officer who served as the 33rd Commander of the Pontifical Swiss Guards, a position which he held between 2002 and 2008, serving Popes John Paul II and Benedict XVI.

== Biography ==
Mäder was born in Henau (now known as Uzwil) in the canton of St. Gallen, one of five children of Theo and Katharina Mäder. He attended school in nearby Zuzwil. Mäder studied law at the Hochschule in St. Gallen and at the University of Fribourg before entering the Swiss Army, where he attained the rank of First Lieutenant in the Air Defense Troops. He was named vice commander of the Papal Swiss Guards in 1998 and named commander by Pope John Paul II on 8 November 2002, succeeding Pius Segmüller. By the time he was appointed commander, he had already reached the rank of colonel. He served under Pope Benedict XVI from 2005.

Mäder made headlines in 2005 when as commander he said that there was no plan to allow women into the Swiss Guards. His reason was that the Guard's quarters were too small and the entry of women would lead to discipline problems. Mäder held the post of commander until being replaced by Daniel Anrig on 19 August 2008.

In 2009, new commander Daniel Anrig backtracked on Mäder's comments, telling television channel Italia 1 when asked about the issue, that women being in the Swiss Guards was "possible".

He was walking along the Popemobile on 6 June 2007 when a German man jumped over the security cordons and tried to jump into the vehicle.

Mäder is married to Theresa Clochliger. They have four children, the fourth of which was baptised by Benedict XVI.

Military offices
Preceded by Pius Segmüller	Commander of the Pontifical Swiss Guard; 2002–2008	Succeeded by Daniel Anrig
