= Kaspar von Silenen =

First ever commander of the Swiss Guard (1467-1517)

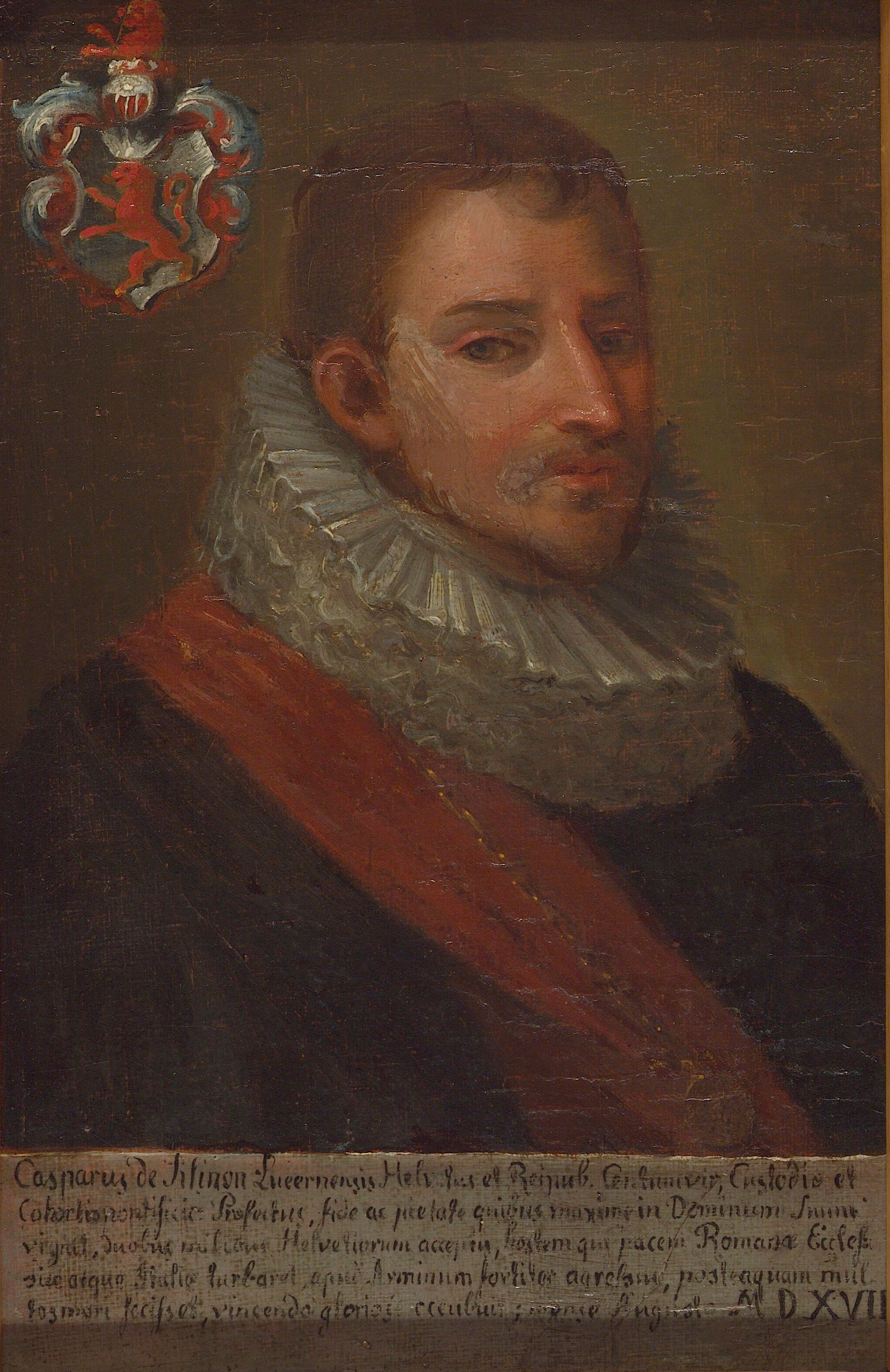
Portrait of Kaspar von Silenen

Kaspar von Silenen (c. 1467 – 5 August 1517) was the first commander or commandant of the Papal Swiss Guard. Born in Lucerne as the son of Ritter Albin of Silenen (canton of Uri), the commander of the Lucerne troops in the battles of Murten and Nancy and of Verena Netstaler. Kaspar married Anne de Rovéréa. He participated in the Naples campaign of Charles VIII of France in 1494. He was reeve of Ebikon from 1497 to 1499, and member of the Lucerne city council from 1497 until 1503, when he was convicted of the illegal recruitment of mercenaries on behalf of France.

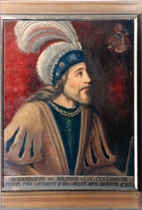

Kaspar led the first contingent of 150 Swiss mercenaries hired by Pope Julius II, entering the Vatican on 22 January 1506 (considered the foundation date of the Pontifical Swiss Guards).

Under Pope Leo X, Kaspar von Silenen's company was one of six Swiss and Grisons mercenary units, totalling 1,800 men, sent to Rimini in the War of Urbino of 1517. They were supposed to help defend the city against the Duke of Urbino until reinforcements could arrive. They were quartered outside the main city walls, in Borgo San Giuliani, because the garrison commander, condottiere Guido Rangoni, was reluctant to let a large mercenary force enter the city. In the evening of 4 August, there were reports of a large enemy force approaching, and Rangoni invited the mercenaries inside, but Kaspar refused due to the late time of the evening, saying his men were already "full of wine". The enemy arrived in the early morning of 5 August and managed to enter the Borgo unnoticed, and killed many of the mercenaries in their sleep. Kaspar also died in this attack.
