= Alois Hirschbühl =

Swiss painter and commander of Pontifical Swiss Guard

Luigi Alois Hirschbühl (11 October 1883 – 20 June 1950) was a Swiss painter and commander of the Pontifical Swiss Guard from 1921 to 1935.

== Life ==
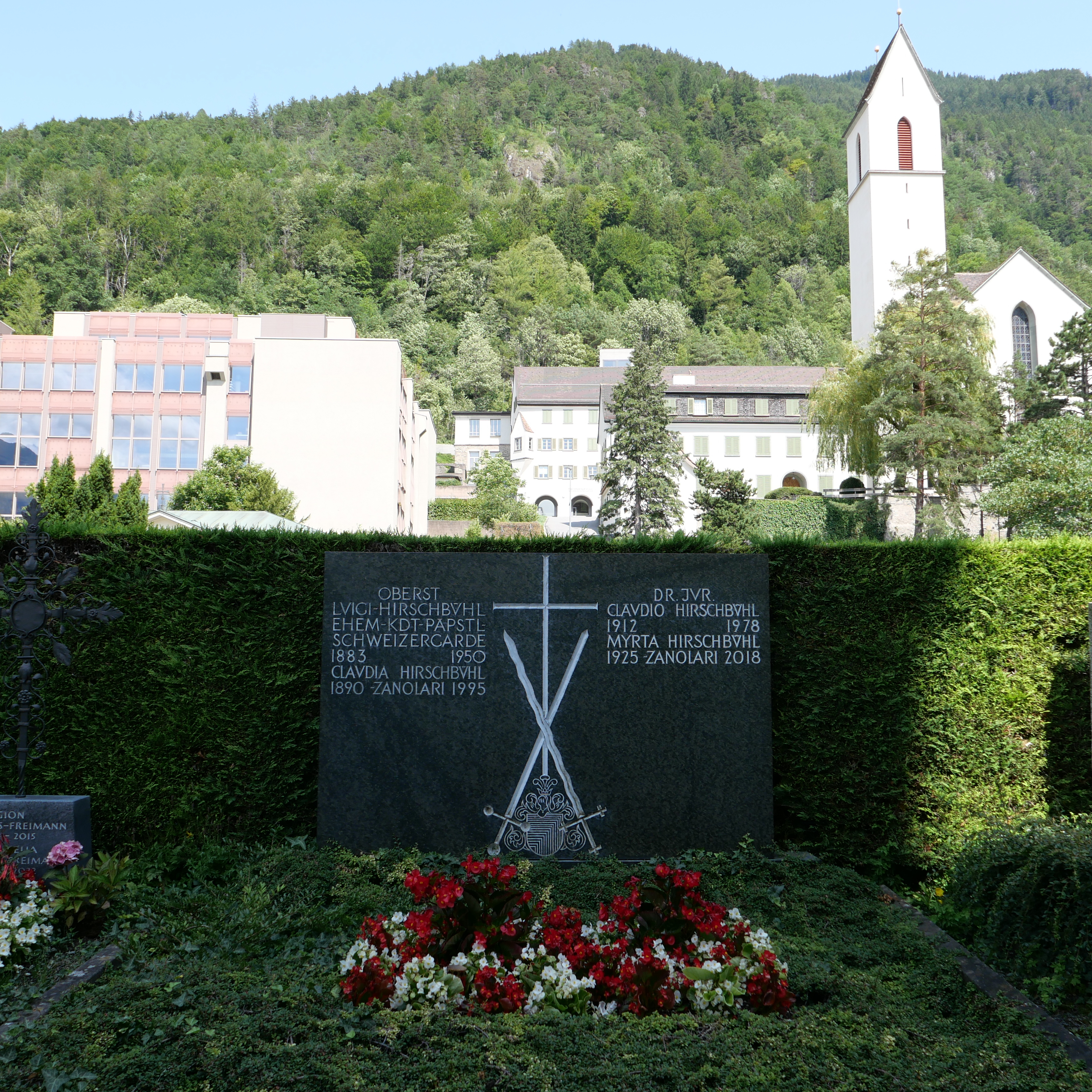
The grave of Hirschbühl, his wife, his son Claudio (1912–1978) and Claudio's wife Myrta (1925–2018) at the Hof cemetery in Chur.

Born in Chur as the son of Anton Hirschbühl, a painter and immigrant from Riefensberg, Vorarlberg and of Walpurga née Willi, of Domat. He married Claudia née Zanolari (1890–1995), of Brusio, and was naturalized as Swiss citizen.

He served with the Pontifical Swiss Guard before spending the year 1904 with the study of painting in Minca.

He re-entered the Swiss Guard in the rank of captain in 1910, promoted to major in 1914 and to lieutenant colonel in 1920, before being promoted to colonel (commander of the guard) in 1921.
