= Daniel Anrig =

Former commander of the Swiss Guard

34th Commander of the Pontifical Swiss Guard
- In office 19 August 2008 – 31 January 2015
- Monarchs: Benedict XVI (2008–2015); Francis (2013–2015)
- Preceded by: Elmar Mäder
- Succeeded by: Christoph Graf

Personal details
- Born: 10 July 1972 (age 54) Walenstadt, Switzerland
- Education: University of Fribourg
- Occupation: military officer police officer

Military service
- Allegiance: Vatican City
- Branch/service: Pontifical Swiss Guard; Swiss Army
- Years of service: 1992–1994; 2008–2015
- Rank: Colonel
- Commands: Pontifical Swiss Guard

Banner of the Pontifical Swiss Guard of Pope Francis under the command of Anrig (2013–2015)

Colonel Daniel Rudolf Anrig (born 10 July 1972) is a Swiss military officer and police officer. He served as the 34th Commandant of the Pontifical Swiss Guard, appointed by Pope Benedict XVI on 19 August 2008. He replaced Elmar Mäder who had served as Commandant of the Swiss Guard since 2002. He was succeeded by Christoph Graf as his term ended on 31 January 2015 and was not extended by Pope Francis.

== Life ==
Anrig was born in Walenstadt (Canton of Saint Gallen), Switzerland. He is married and has four children. Anrig served as a halberdier in the Swiss Guard between 1992 and 1994. He graduated in civil and ecclesiastical law from the University of Fribourg in 1999.

In 2020, he was fined by the Zurich district court for threatening to kill himself, his ex-partner and their son.

In 2024, Anrig was sentenced by a Swiss court to a conditional sentence of ten months and to a fine of 1,000 francs; where in November 2022 he had threatened a man with a running chainsaw.

== Career ==
Anrig held the rank of a captain in the Swiss Army.

He was head of criminal police in the canton of Glarus from 2002 to March 2006, when he became commanding general of police in the canton of Glarus. In 2003, Anrig was jointly responsible for a controversial raid by the Glarus cantonal police on human and drug trafficking in a home for asylum seekers. Following a complaint by Amnesty International, the investigating judge dropped the investigation into disproportionate action by the police because no findings relevant to criminal law were made. However, Anrig had to bear part of the legal costs.

On 19 August 2008, Anrig was appointed as the thirty-fourth Commandant of the Pontifical Swiss Guard by Pope Benedict XVI.

The period between 2012 and 2014 was increasingly overshadowed by internal quarrels. In 2012, the head of the Vatican police, Domenico Giani, and not Anrig, was honored by the international Catholic association "Tu es petrus" for his services to the security of the pope. In the tribute, Giani was referred to as the "Guardian Angel of the Pope".

On 2 December 2014, Anrig was unexpectedly dismissed. He was reported to rule with an iron fist and lived in a luxury apartment. His military style was alleged to irritate Pope Francis. The pope and ex-guards denied this.

From July 2015 to 2020, Anrig was head of the Staff Department – the smallest of four departments – at the office of the Zurich cantonal police at Zürich Airport, which was questioned critically.

From 1 November 2020, Anrig was in charge of public administration in Zermatt as a communal secretary. In November 2022, he was reported missing for several weeks before the commune declared that he was sitting in pre-trial detention for a "relationship conflict". In February 2023, he was released and his employment with the commune of Zermatt was terminated.

Military offices
Preceded by Elmar Mäder	Commander of the Pontifical Swiss Guard; 2008–2015	Succeeded by Christoph Graf
