= Meyer von Schauensee =

Meyer von Schauensee was a family of the patriciate of Lucerne in the 17th, 18th and 19th centuries. The family is descended from Andreas Meyer, member of the Lucerne Grand Council in 1523, and his son Leodegar, member of the Lesser Council in 1581. From 1618, the Meyer and Balthasar families acquired considerable wealth due to their control of the trade with Milan.

== Life ==
Originally named Meyer, Joseph Leonz Meyer (1695–1764) acquired Schauensee castle near Kriens in 1749. He and his direct descendants called themselves "von Schauensee" from this time, and the entire Meyer family officially adopted the "von Schauensee" byname in 1895. Historiography in the 20th century has tended to anachronistically use the name of "Meyer von Schauensee" of all members of the Meyer family in the later 19th century, while historically only the direct descendants of Joseph Leonz used this name prior to 1985.

Notable members include:

- Franz Joseph Leonti Meyer (1720–1789), musician
- Joseph Rudolph Valentin Meyer (1725–1808), politician, soldier and economist
- Gerold Meyer (1729–1810), priest and theologian
- Bernhard Meyer (1735–1805), priest and theologian
- Xaver Meyer (1769-1829) and sons, publishers and printers, edited the Luzerner Tagblatt newspaper from 1852
- Ludwig Meyer von Schauensee (1768–1841), priest and theologian
- Ludwig Rudolf Meyer von Schauensee (1806–1870), banker and freemason
- Maurus Meyer von Schauensee (1765–1802), member of the Swiss Guard in Paris during the French Revolution, later general in the French Revolutionary Army
- Friedrich Fridolin Meyer von Schauensee (1777–1860), general in the Grande Armée and French Royal Army
- Franz Leopold Meyer von Schauensee (1803–1860) commander of the Pontifical Swiss Guard
- Leopold Meyer von Schauensee (1852–1910), commander of the Pontifical Swiss Guard
