= Christoph Graf =

35th Commander of the Pontifical Swiss Guard

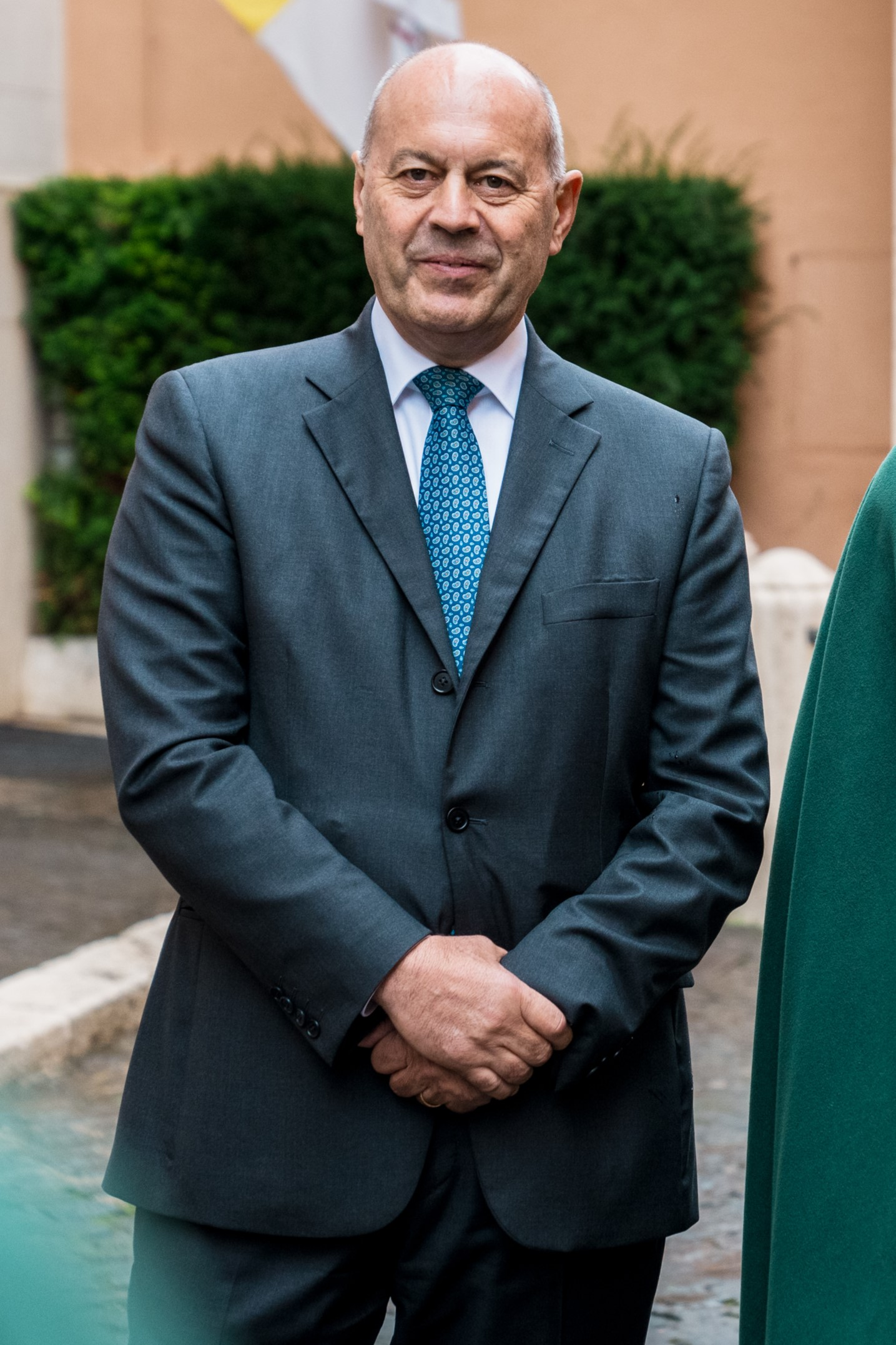
- Graf in 2024

35th Commander of the Pontifical Swiss Guard
- Incumbent
- Assumed office 7 February 2015
- Monarchs: Francis (2015–2025); Leo XIV (2025–present)
- Preceded by: Daniel Anrig

Personal details
- Born: 5 September 1961 (age 65) Pfaffnau, Switzerland

Military service
- Allegiance: Vatican City
- Branch/service: Pontifical Swiss Guard
- Years of service: 1987–present
- Rank: Colonel

Colonel Christoph Graf (born 5 September 1961) is a Swiss military officer. He serves as the 35th Commander of the Pontifical Swiss Guard, appointed by Pope Francis on 7 February 2015, succeeding Colonel Daniel Anrig.

== Biography ==
Graf was born in Pfaffnau, in the canton of Lucerne, Switzerland. He joined the Swiss Guard in 1987. In August 1999 he was promoted to sergeant, and later in 2000 he was promoted to sergeant-major, a position in which he remained until April 2009 when he was promoted to second captain. In October 2010, he was promoted to lieutenant colonel and vice commander of the guard, where he acted as a chief of staff and senior adviser to the commander.

In late 2014, it was announced that Anrig would leave the position of commander after seven years of service. On 7 February 2015, Pope Francis appointed Graf as the new commander of the Pontifical Swiss Guard.

Military offices
| Preceded by Daniel Anrig | Commander of the Pontifical Swiss Guard; 2015–present | Incumbent |
