= Crime in Vatican City =

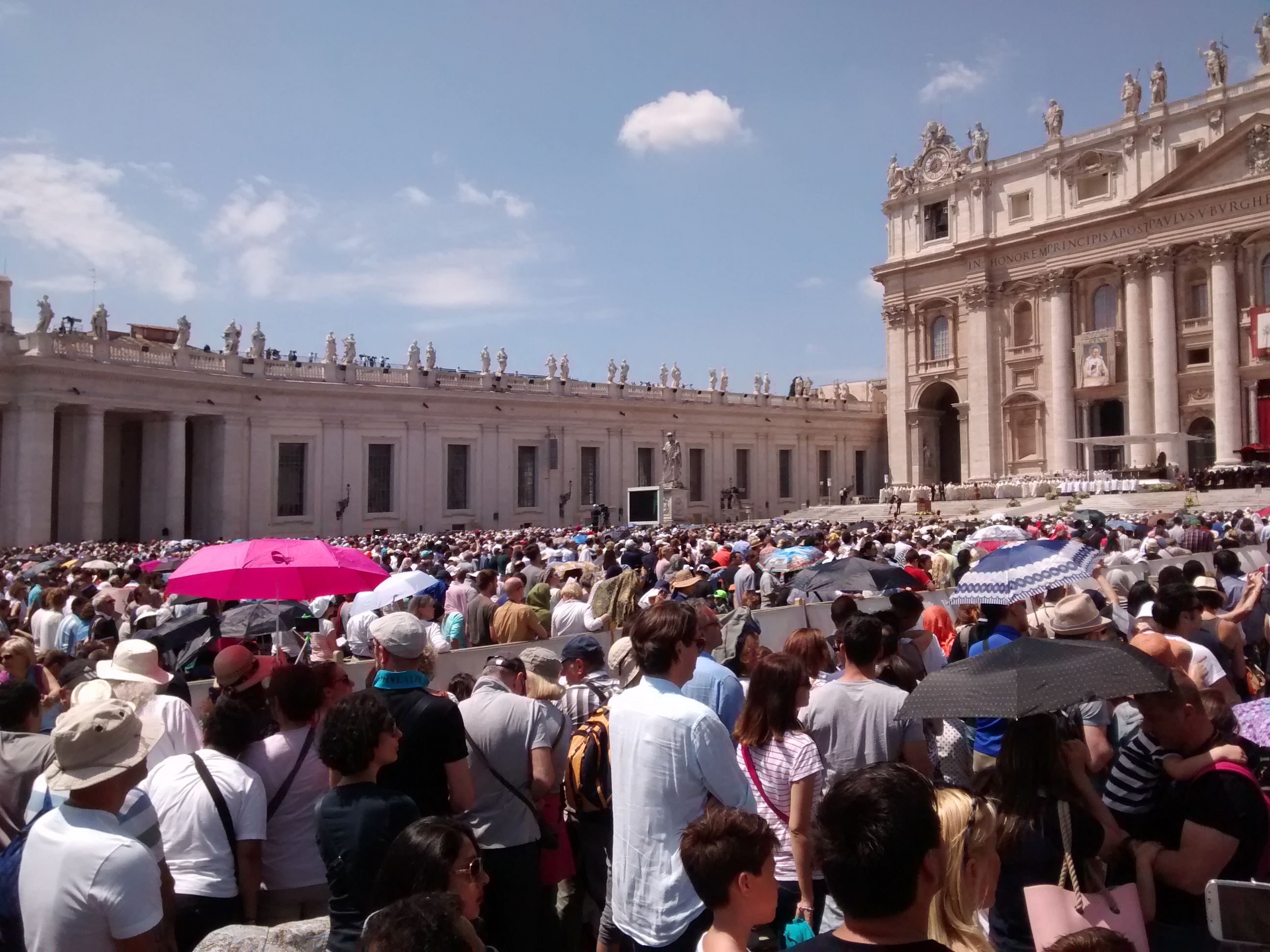
The crowds of tourists in St. Peter's Square are a target for pickpockets.

Crime in the Vatican City consists largely of purse snatching, pick-pocketing and shoplifting committed by non-residents. The tourist foot-traffic in St. Peter's Square is one of the main locations for pickpockets in Vatican City.

== Petty crimes per capita ==
Vatican City's extremely small size results in some statistical oddities. There are 18 million visitors to the state each year, and the most common crime is petty theft — purse snatching, pick-pocketing and shoplifting — typically perpetrated and suffered by outsiders.

Based on a population of 455 in 1992, the 397 civil offences in that year represent a crime rate of 0.87 crimes per capita, with 608 penal offences or 1.33 per capita.

== Policing ==
=== Police forces ===
The Corpo della Gendarmeria dello Stato della Città del Vaticano (English: Corps of Gendarmerie of Vatican City) is the gendarmerie, or police and security force, of Vatican City and the extraterritorial properties of the Holy See.

The corps is responsible for security, public order, border control, traffic control, criminal investigation, and other general police duties in Vatican City including providing security for the pope outside of Vatican City. The corps has 130 personnel and is a part of the Security and Civil Defence Services Department (which also includes the Vatican Fire Brigade), an organ of the Governorate of Vatican City.

The Pontifical Swiss Guards are in charge of protecting the Pope and the Apostolic Palace.

=== Cooperation with the Italian government ===
In accordance with article 3 of the 1929 Lateran Treaty between the Holy See and Italy, St. Peter's Square, although part of the Vatican City State, is normally patrolled by the Italian police, up to but not including the steps leading to the basilica.

Article 22 of the Lateran Treaty provides that the Italian government, when requested by the Holy See, seeks prosecution and detention of criminal suspects, at the expense of the Vatican.

Vatican City has no prison system, apart from a few cells for pre-trial detention. People sentenced to imprisonment by Vatican City serve time in Italian prisons, with costs covered by Vatican City.

=== Abolition of capital punishment (1969) ===
In 1969, Vatican City abolished capital punishment. It had been envisaged in legislation Vatican City adopted in 1929 based on Italian law, but the power was never exercised.

=== Establishment of Head Prosecutor (2020) ===
On March 16, 2020, Pope Francis made public legislation which requires a head for the Office of the Promoter of Justice (prosecutor's office), and sets out a standardized procedure for possible disciplinary action against certified advocates.

== Notable incidents ==
=== Assassination attempt ===
A few major criminal events have occurred in recent decades within Vatican territory. On May 13, 1981, Pope John Paul II suffered an assassination attempt by Mehmet Ali Ağca. This episode led to a much stronger emphasis on the Swiss Guard's functional, non-ceremonial roles. This has included enhanced training in unarmed combat and small arms. The small arms are the same as those used in the Swiss army.

=== Swiss Guard killing ===
On May 4, 1998, the Swiss Guard experienced one of its greatest scandals for over 100 years when the commander of the Guard, Alois Estermann, was murdered in unclear circumstances in Vatican City. According to the official Vatican version, Estermann and his wife, Gladys Meza Romero, were killed by the young Swiss Guard Cédric Tornay, who later committed suicide. Estermann had been named commander of the Swiss Guard the same day.

=== Vatican Bank scandal ===
The Vatican Bank was Banco Ambrosiano's main shareholder. Archbishop Paul Marcinkus, head of the Institute for Religious Works from 1971 to 1989, was indicted in Italy in 1981 as an accessory in the $3.5 billion collapse of Banco Ambrosiano, one of the major post-war financial scandals. Banco Ambrosiano was accused of laundering drug money for the Sicilian Mafia.

=== Theft of secret documents ===
The Vatican leaks scandal is a scandal involving leaked Vatican documents, allegedly exposing corruption.

The scandal first came to light in January 2012, when Italian journalist Gianluigi Nuzzi published letters from Carlo Maria Viganò, formerly the second-ranked Vatican administrator to the pope, in which he begged not to be transferred for having exposed alleged corruption that cost the Holy See millions in higher contract prices. Viganò was later named Apostolic Nuncio to the United States. Paolo Gabriele, the papal butler, was indicted by Vatican magistrates on 13 August 2012 for aggravated theft.

On 6 October, Gabriele was found to be guilty and was sentenced to a reduced sentence of 18 months. Gabriele was also ordered to pay legal expenses.

However, in a departure from the usual arrangement that sends convicted prisoners to serve time in an Italian prison, Gabriele served his sentence in a detention cell inside the Vatican police barracks. He was pardoned by Pope Benedict XVI on 22 December 2012.

=== Sex abuse trial ===
On 14 October 2020, the first-ever criminal sex abuse trial held within the Vatican City began, and involved a priest accused of sexually abusing a former St. Pius X youth seminary student between 2007 and 2012 and another for aiding and abetting the abuse. On 23 January 2024, one of the priests was sentenced to two-and-a-half-years in prison and issued fines—including covering the victim’s legal fees—on the charge of corruption of a minor.

== See also ==
- Law of Vatican City
- Index of Vatican City-related articles
