= Domenico Giani =

Italian security expert (born 1962)

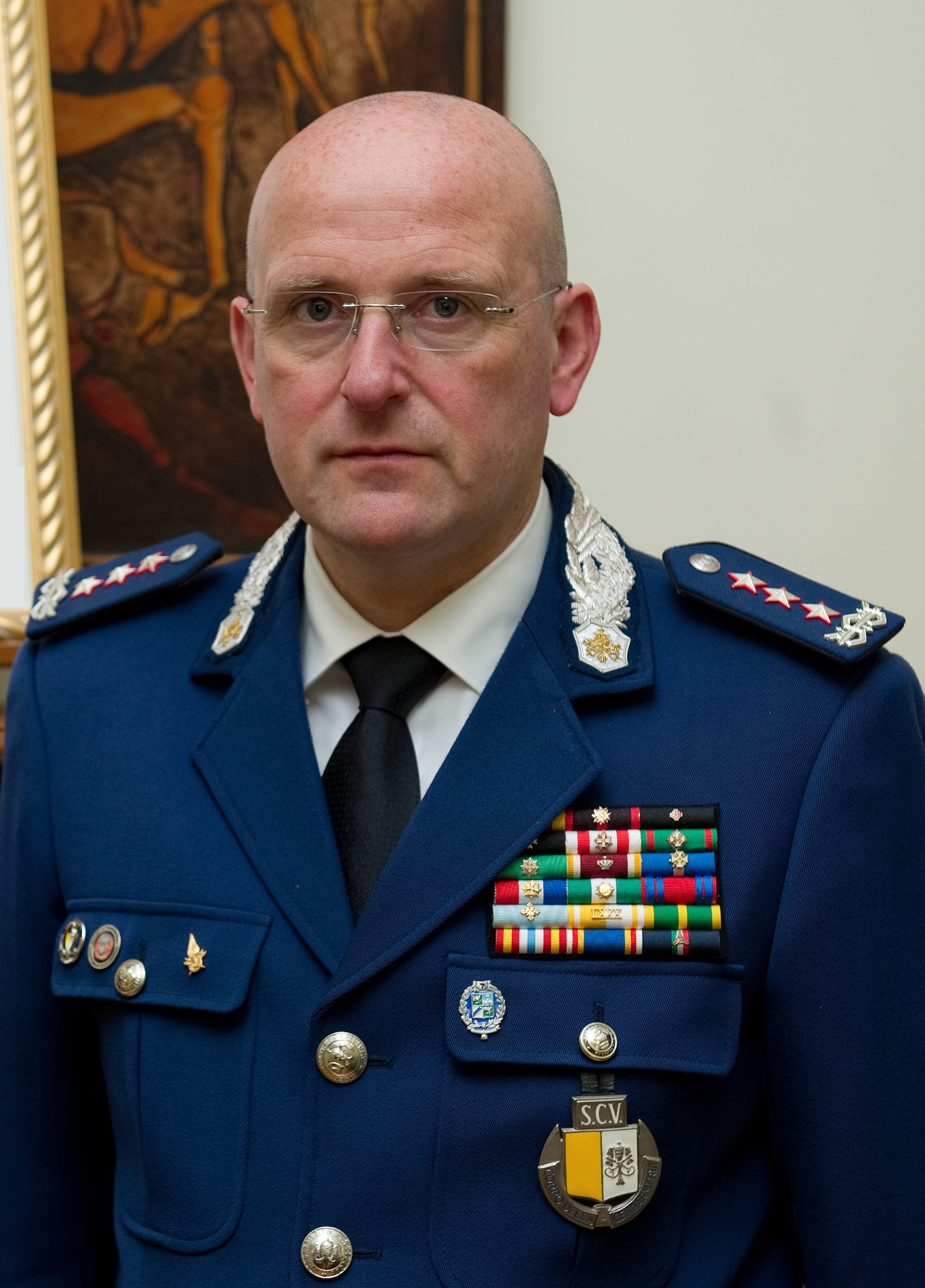
Domenico Giani (2011)

Domenico Giani (born 16 August 1962) is an Italian ex-police officer and security expert. He was the Inspector General of the Corpo della Gendarmeria, the police and security force of Vatican City.

== Biography ==
Giani was born on 16 August 1962 in Arezzo, Italy.

He graduated with honours in pedagogy from the Faculty of Education of the University of Siena, and he served as a non-commissioned officer and as an officer of the Guardia di Finanza. Then he worked in the Intelligence and Democratic Security Service, part of the Italian Intelligence Service.

In 1999, Domenico Giani became the deputy to Camillo Cibin, longtime chief of the Vatican's police force, then known as the Security Corps of Vatican City State. He became its head on 3 June 2006, when it was known as the Corpo della Gendarmeria. He headed a unit of 130 military-trained policemen.

Giani tackled Susanna Maiolo twice in two separate attacks on Pope Benedict during Christmas Eve Midnight Mass at St. Peter's Basilica in 2008 and 2009.

Under his command, the Vatican City State became part of Interpol at the general assembly held in St. Petersburg on 7 October 2008. The Vatican was represented by Giani and Monsignor Renato Boccardo, Secretary General of the Governorate of the Vatican City State. Giani was involved in 2013 in the interceptions concerning Monsignor Nunzio Scarano.

In early October 2019, at the request of the IOR, Pope Francis authorised the Gendarmerie to raid the offices of the Sostituto within the State Department as part of an investigation into financial irregularities related to a failed London real estate deal. Giani then authored an internal flyer that named and pictured five Vatican employees who were suspended as part of that investigation. That flyer was leaked to the Italian weekly magazine L'Espresso, which published it. Though not associated with the leak, Giani resigned on 14 October to allow an impartial investigation to proceed. (Note: La Repubblica reported that Pope Francis was displeased with the way Giani had conducted his investigation, especially the searching of offices on 2 October, and the leak provided an excuse for a dismissal that Giani was expecting, though not expecting so quickly.) News coverage of his resignation resulted in additional dissemination of the names of those suspended. On 15 October, Pope Francis appointed Gianluca Gauzzi Broccoletti, who had served as Giani's deputy since 2018, to succeed him. The Pope also visited Giani, his wife, and one of their two children at their Vatican City home on the evening of 15 October to reiterate his appreciation for Giani's service. Cardinal Angelo Becciu criticized Giani for creating the leaked document; he said a leaflet identifying the accused with mug shots in the style of a wanted poster was excessive.
