= Camillo Cibin =

Inspector General of the Vatican Gendarme Corps

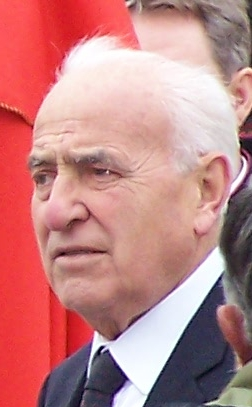
- Born: 3 June 1926; Salgareda
- Died: 25 October 2009 (aged 83); Rome
- Occupation: Inspector General of the Vatican Gendarme Corps
- Spouse: Maria Cibin
- Children: Three

Camillo Cibin (3 June 1926 – 25 October 2009) was a military and Papal bodyguard and Inspector General of the Corpo della Gendarmeria, the security and police force of Vatican City. He retired in 2006 after 58 years of service in the security force, and over 40 years as its commander. He served as a bodyguard to six popes and was known as "The Pope's Guardian Angel".

== Early life and career ==
Camillo Cibin was born at Salgareda, in the northern province of Treviso in Italy, on 3 June 1926. He joined the Vatican police force at age 21. He began serving in charge of security at the Vatican Council in the 1960s. He was appointed inspector-general of the Vatican Gendarmerie in 1972. Cibin was considered so discreet that it was joked about in the Vatican that he never answered a question, even "What time is it?".

== Pope John Paul II Assassination attempt ==
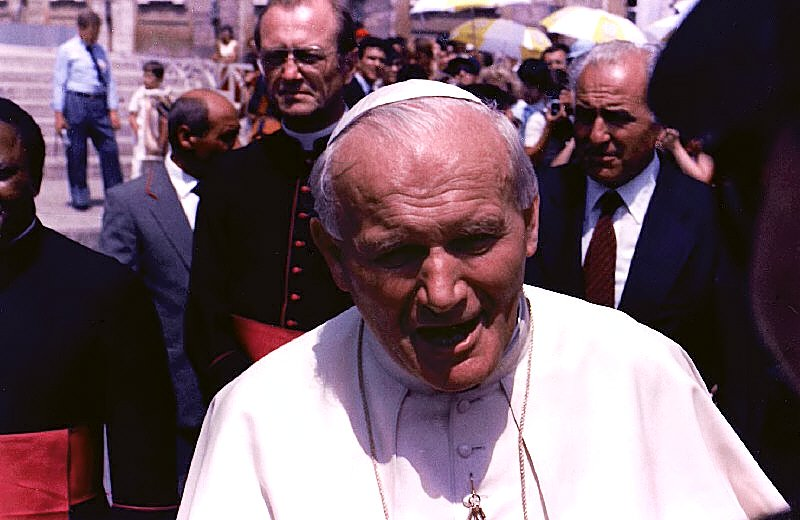
Pope John Paul II at a Papal Audience on 17 July, 1985—St. Peter's Square, Vatican City. Behind him, Camillo Cibin and Paul Josef Cordes, at this time vice president of the Pontifical Council for the Laity.

Cibin was with Pope John Paul II when the pontiff was shot in St. Peter's Square in 1981. Cibin captured Mehmet Ali Ağca, who was convicted of the assassination attempt and spent 19 years in an Italian prison. Cibin tried to resign after this but the Pope insisted he remain in his post, and claimed that Our Lady of Fatima had helped his survival.

A year later, Cibin prevented priest Juan María Fernández y Krohn from stabbing the pontiff during his visit to Fatima, in Portugal, a visit to the shrine of Our Lady, arranged to give thanks for the Pope's survival of the first attack.

Cibin retired at age 79, having protected Pope John Paul in 104 places and escorted Pope Benedict XVI to Germany and Poland.

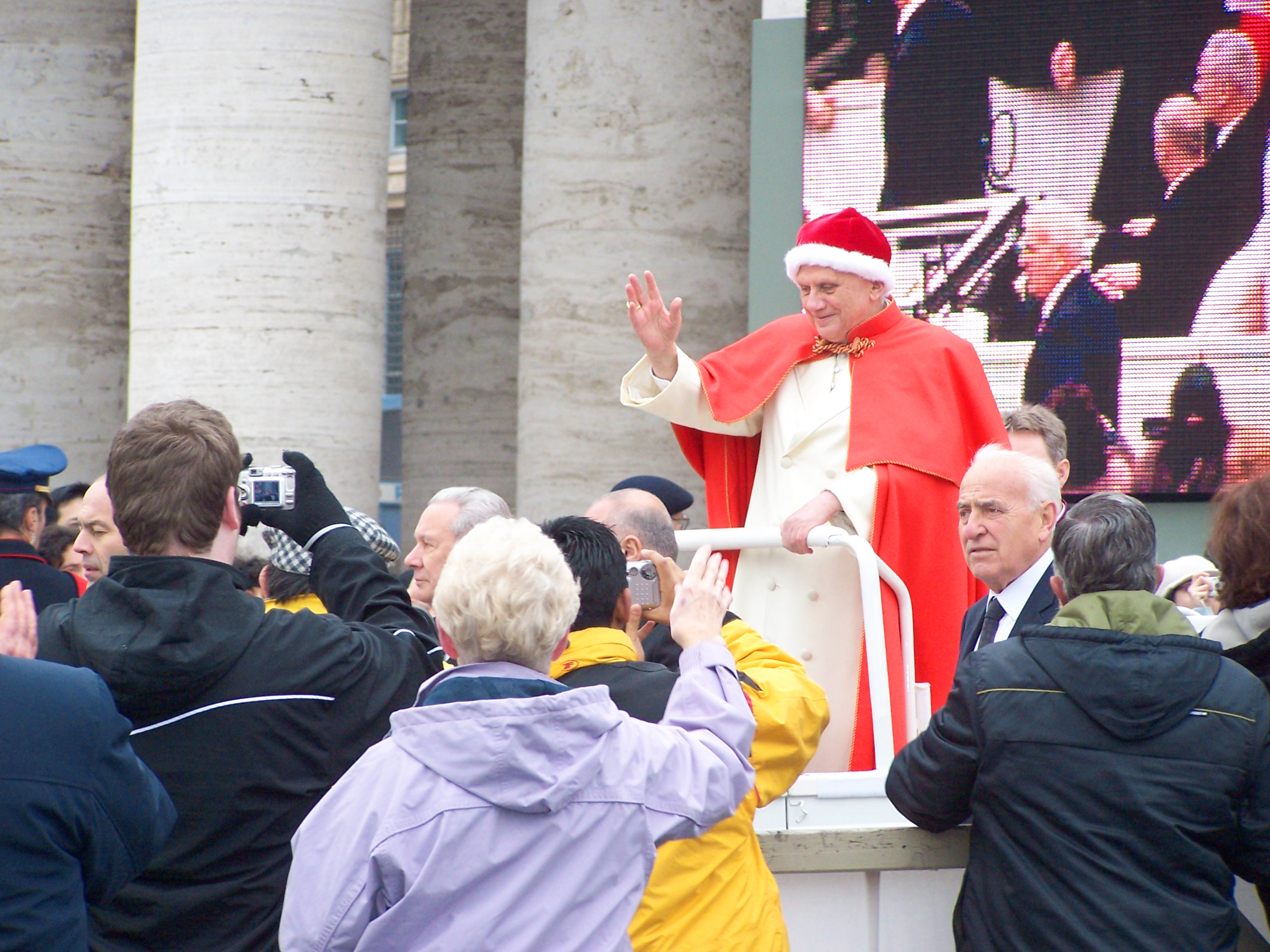
Pope Benedict XVI in Italy flanked by Cibin on the right.

== Death and funeral ==
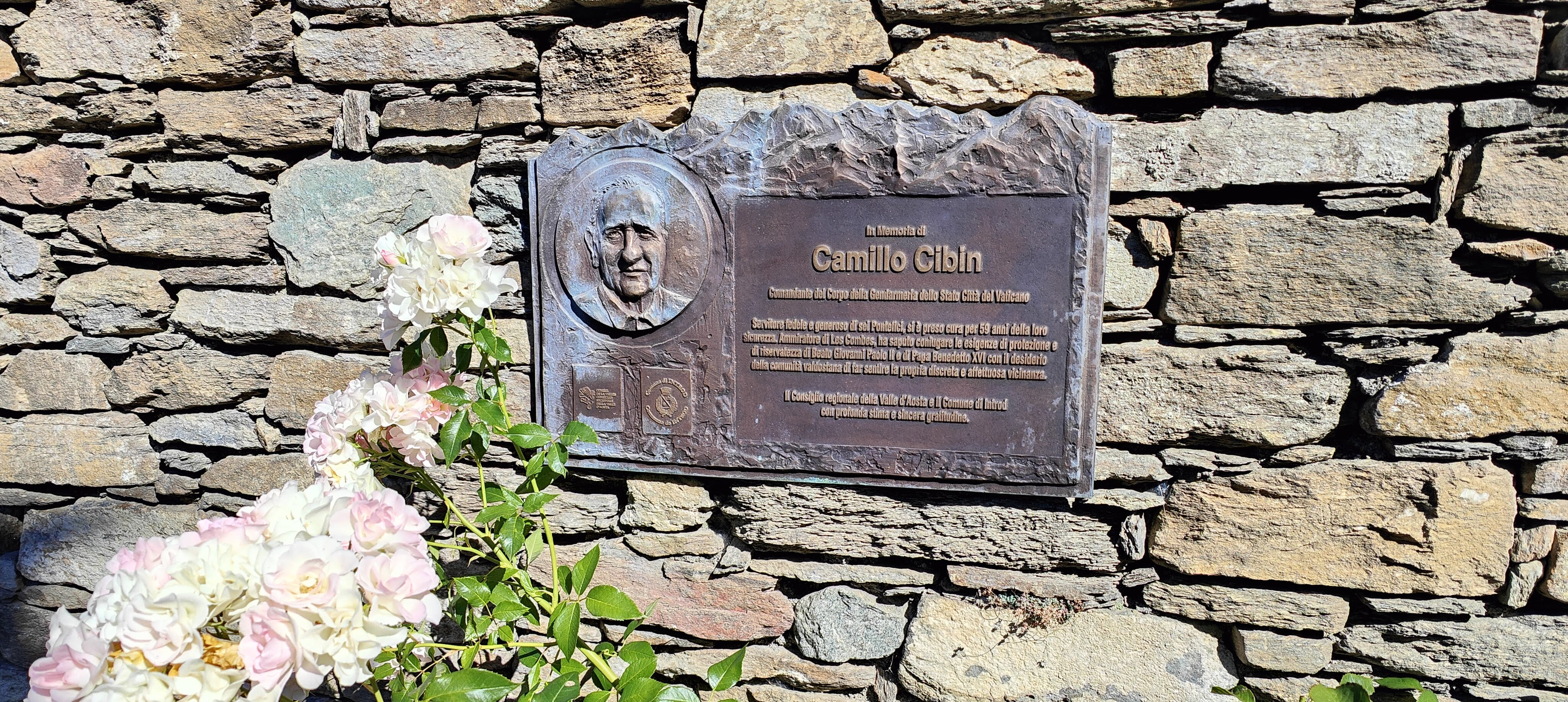
Memorial plaque in honour of Camilo Cibin which reads "Faithful and generous servant of six Popes, he took care of their security for 59 years. An admirer of Les Combes, he was able to combine Blessed John Paul II's and Pope Benedict XVI's need for protection and confidentiality with the Aosta Valley community's desire to make its discreet and affectionate closeness felt. The Aosta Valley Regional Council and the Municipality of Introd with deep esteem and sincere gratitude",

Cibin died at 83 of natural causes. His funeral mass was performed in St. Peter's Square in the Vatican City.

A commemorative plaque was unveiled in Cibin's memory on 16 October 2011, in Les Combes d'Introd in the Aosta Valley.
