= Corps of Firefighters of the Vatican City State =

Fire brigade of the Vatican City State

- Corpo dei vigili del fuoco dello Stato della Città del Vaticano
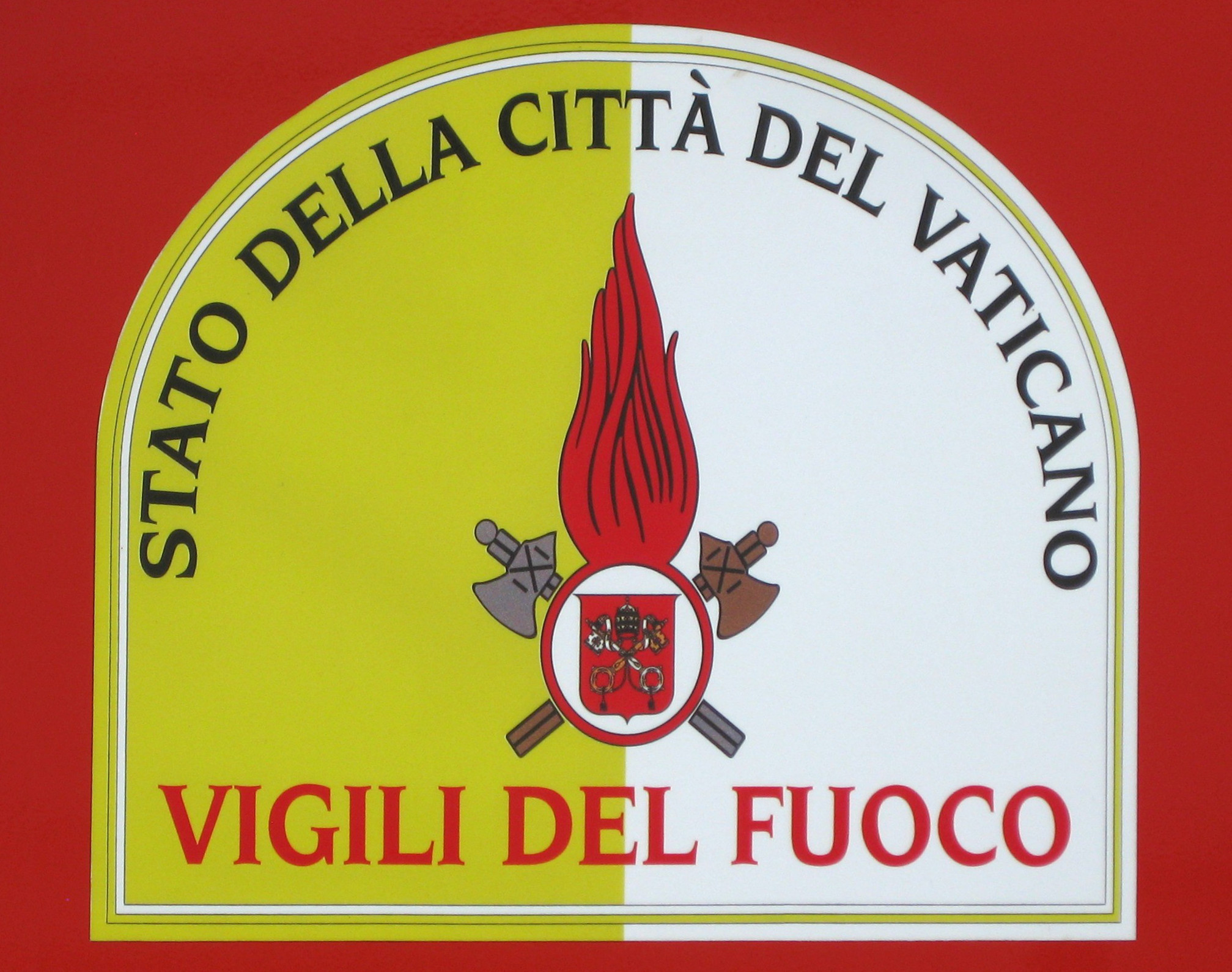

Operational area
- Country: Vatican City
- Supporting: Holy See
- Address: Courtyard of the Belvedere; 00120 Vatican City

Agency overview
- Established: 1941
- Employees: 37
- Commissioner: Gianluca Gauzzi Broccoletti
- Fire chief: Paolo de Angelis

Facilities and equipment
- Stations: 1 (Belvedere Courtyard)
- Engines: 3
- Trucks: 1
- Rescues: 1
- Tenders: 2 (tow truck, jeep)

Website
- Vatican Fire Brigade

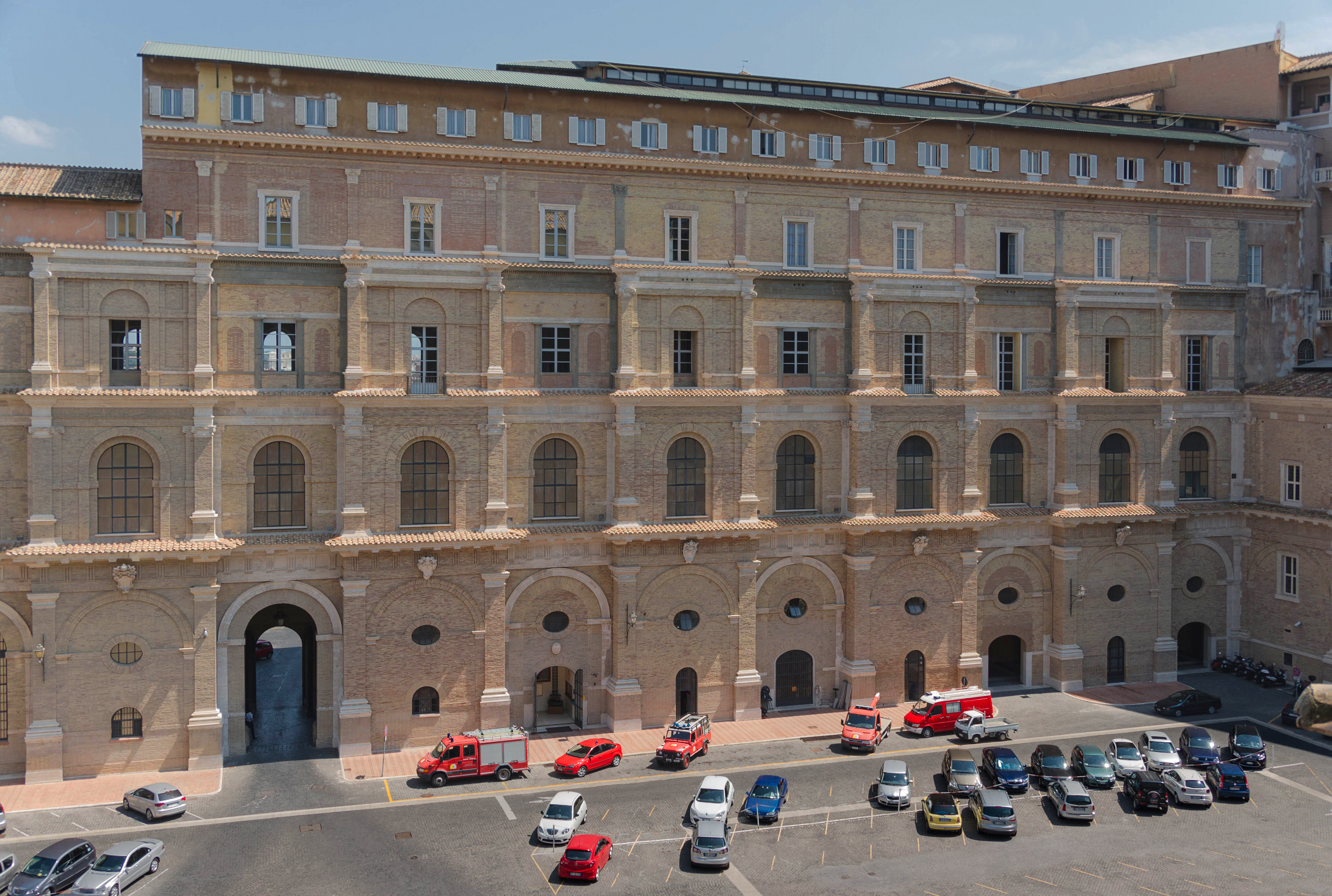
Vatican Fire Brigade headquarters at Belvedere Courtyard, Vatican City with some equipment

The Corps of Firefighters of the Vatican City State (Italian: Corpo dei vigili del fuoco dello Stato della Città del Vaticano; Latin: Corpora Ignis Pompierum Civitatis Vaticanae) is the fire brigade of the Vatican City State. It was founded in its present form by Pope Pius XII in 1941, although its origins are much older.

The patron saints of the Corps are Pope Leo IV, to whom tradition attributes the miraculous extinction of a fire in the Borgo district (event represented by Raphael's fresco of the Fire in the Borgo) and Saint Barbara, also the patron saint of firefighters in Italy. The anniversary of the celebration of the Corps is on 4 December.

== History ==
From at least 1820, the military corps of the Papal States included a uniformed and armed fire fighting service, the Guardie dei Fuoco, whose elaborate uniforms are represented in pictures of the era preserved in the Vatican archives. Although officially part of the armed forces, by the early twentieth century they had become solely engaged in fire fighting and civil defence.

In 1941, Pope Pius XII refounded the service as the Corps of Firefighters of the Vatican City State. It initially consisted of 10 sections trained at firefighting schools in Rome. The Corps was entrusted with the protection of Saint Anthony's Abbot and was seated in the Apostolic Palace, with entry from the courtyard of the Belvedere, where it is still today.

In 2002, following a reform carried out by Pope John Paul II, the body moved from the dependencies of the Directorate of Technical Services of the Governorate to the Directorate of Civil Protection and Security Services, which also covers the Corps of Gendarmerie of Vatican City.

The Corps maintains a small museum of Vatican firefighting history within its headquarters at Belvedere Courtyard.

== Political control ==
Politically, the Vatican fire brigade has been under the control of the Directorate for Security Services and Civil Defence, since this body was legally established on 16 July 2002. The Directorate is a division of the Governorate of Vatican City State. The Directorate for Security Services and Civil Defence is responsible not only for the Vatican fire brigade, but also for the Corps of Gendarmerie of Vatican City, and for liaison with the Pontifical Swiss Guard, the military force of the Holy See. As with all Vatican City State forces, the Pope is the head of state and chief commander of the Corps, and takes a direct interest in its operation.

== Duties and operations ==
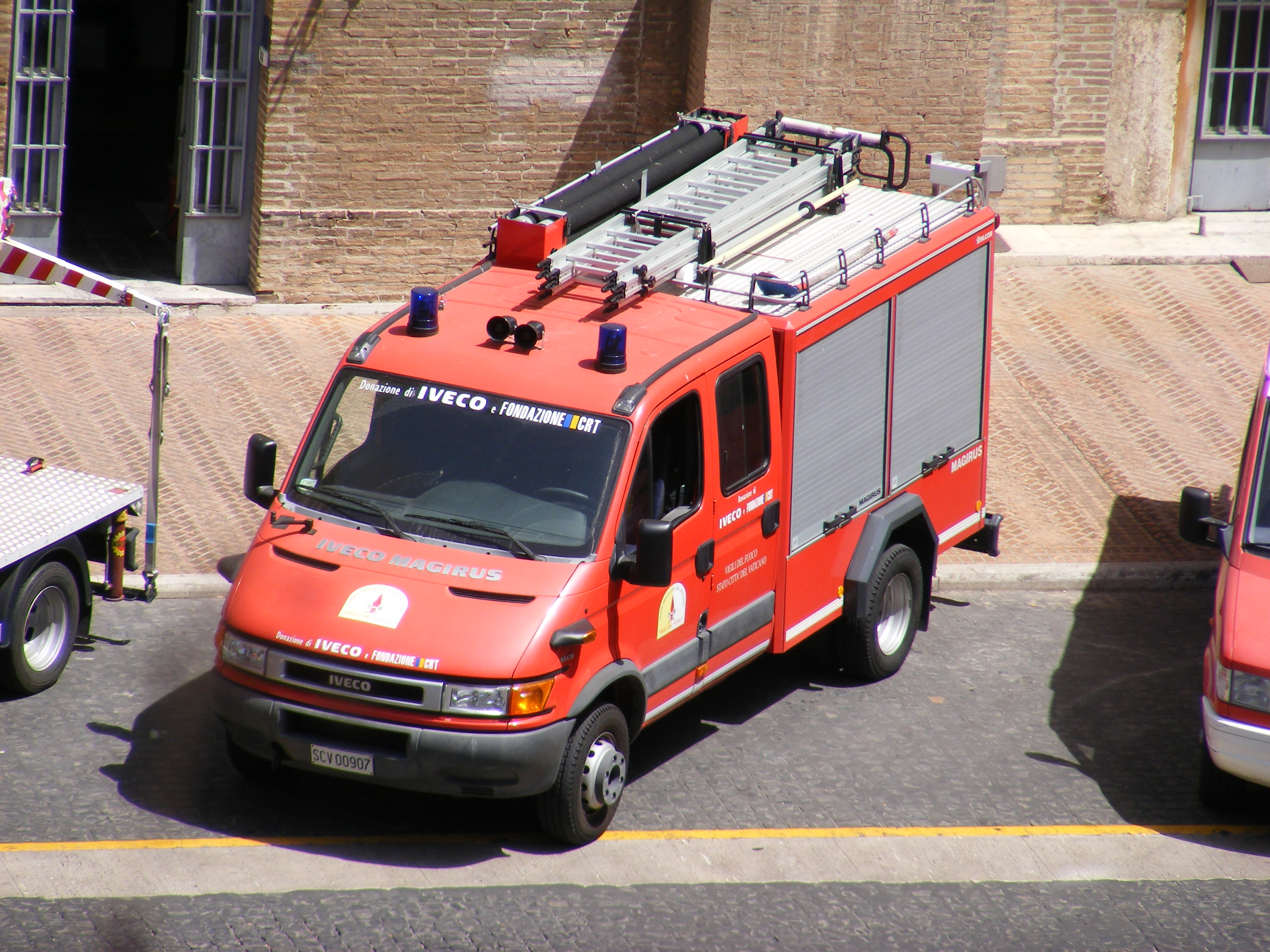
Falcon 1000 fire appliance in Vatican City.

Fire Brigade Headquarters is located at Belvedere Courtyard, a central location within the Vatican City State. Belvedere Courtyard is also the only operational fire station of the Corps.

=== Fire, rescue, and civil defence ===
Although the small size of the Vatican City makes dangerous fires a rare occurrence, the Corps is turned out, on average, more than once every day, to respond to demands for their varied skills in relation to first aid, civil defence, rescue, flood control, or simply the movement of vehicles, or provision of lifting or moving equipment.

The Corps' duties include the installation and maintenance of fire alarm systems and fire fighting equipment throughout the State, and also in some extraterritorial locations of the Vatican City State in Rome.

One of the most common rescues is the recovery of tourists who have become unwell or disorientated whilst climbing into the 450-foot-high dome of St Peter's Basilica.

On Sunday 1 September 2019, Pope Francis, who was the Vatican Fire Brigade's commander-in-chief, became stuck in a failed lift (internal elevator) on his way to give his weekly audience to the crowd in St. Peter's Square. He was rescued by the on-duty squad of the Corps of Firefighters, and began his address by asking the assembled crowd to join him in a round of applause for the Vatican Firefighters.

=== Ceremonial ===
The Corps also has some more unusual duties, including responsibility for the erection and safe operation of the famous chimney over the Sistine Chapel through which black or white smoke indicates (respectively) the non-election or election of a new pope during a papal conclave. The ceremony (involving the burning of the used ballot papers from the Conclave's voting process) is watched by millions of people, in person and via news media.

The Corps also has a minor ceremonial role within the state, and uniformed firefighters form guards of honour for certain formal receptions, and arrivals of guests of honour, as well as marching (with attachments of the Vatican Gendarmerie and of the Swiss Guard) in ceremonial parades on festal occasions.

=== Heliport ===
The Corps of Firefighters also provides specialist heliport fire services at the Vatican City Heliport. Members of the Corps are on duty at the heliport whenever an aircraft lands or takes off.

In 2019, MAN Truck & Bus donated a brand new MAN TGE 6.180 heliport tender with water cannon (capable of delivering a jet of either water or foam) for use as the principal heliport fire appliance. The vehicle was blessed by Pope Francis before entering service.

== Staffing ==
=== Operational numbers ===
In 1941, the Corps of Firefighters of the Vatican City State consisted of just 10 firemen. The modern service has expanded considerably, with a current deployment of 37 firefighters. They work in a rotating shift pattern, with three eight-hour shifts in each day.

=== Recruitment ===
All new recruits are required to be male, unmarried, no older than 25, and practicing Catholics. All applications to join the Corps must be accompanied by a certificate of Catholic practice, signed by a Catholic parish priest.

Newly recruited staff receive initial training with the Italian fire service, at its "Scuola di Formazione di Base dei Vigili del Fuoco" (basic training school) in Rome, before deploying in the Vatican. In-service training is carried out internally by the Corps of Firefighters of Vatican City.

=== Ranks ===
Fire cover is provided 24 hours per day, with a squad always on duty, on a rotational basis. Several "Vigile del fuoco" (firefighters) form a squad, under the supervision of a "Capo Squadra di seconda classe" (deputy team leader) and a "Capo Squadra di prima classe" (team leader). Management of the Corps is provided by a small team of senior officers, led by an "Ufficiale Coordinatore" (coordinating officer). The current Ufficiale Coordinatore is Paolo de Angelis.

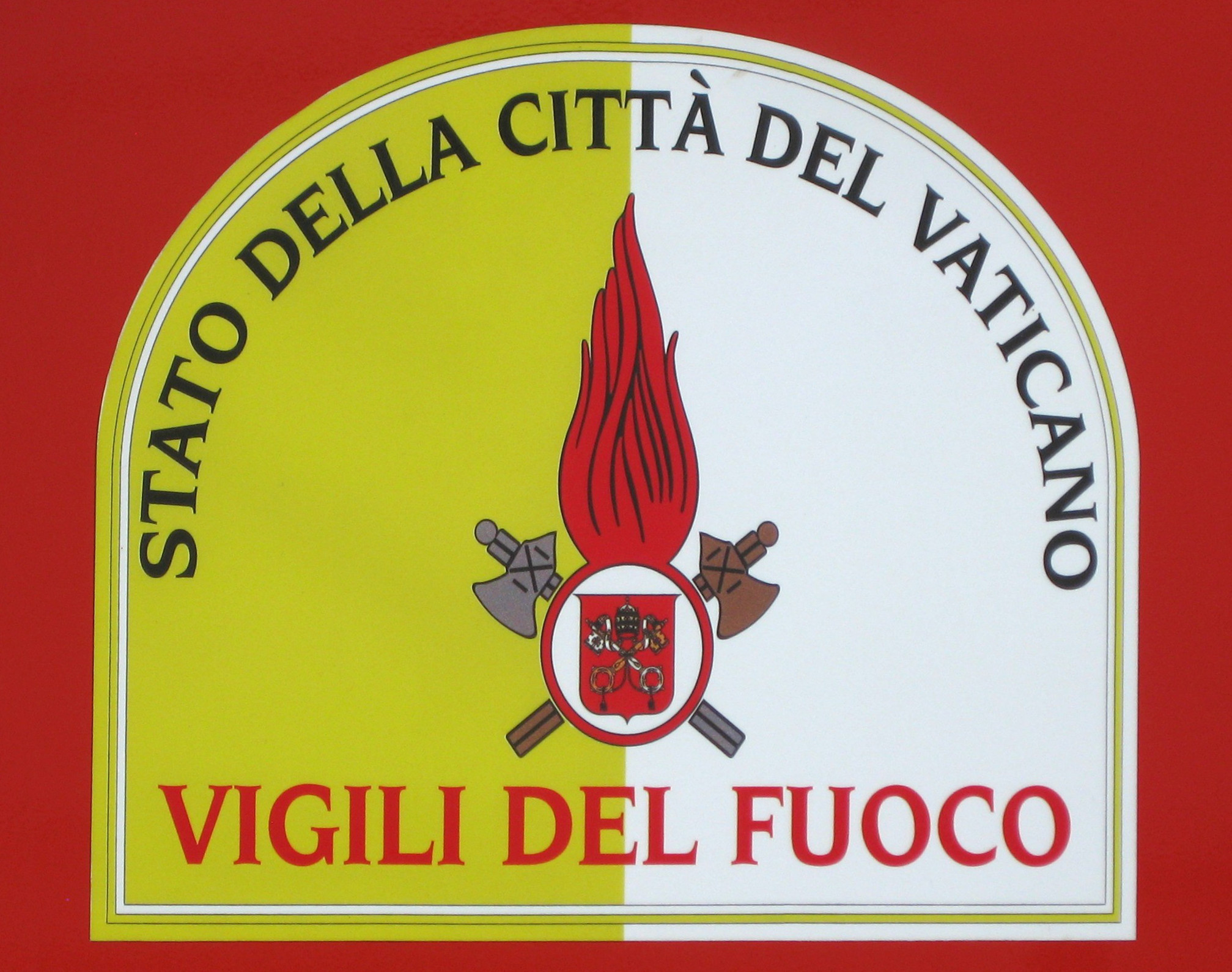
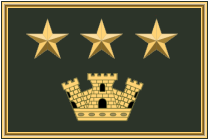
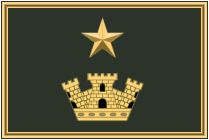
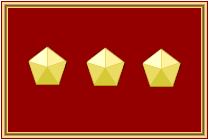
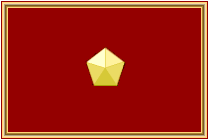
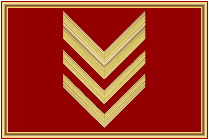
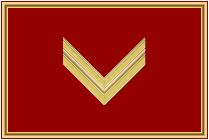
Chief officers	Officers	SNCOs		NCOs	Firefighters	Students
Primo Dirigente coordinatore	Capo squadra esperto	Capo Squadra di prima classe	Capo Squadra di seconda classe	Vigile del fuoco prima classe	Vigile del fuoco seconda classe	Allievo vigile del fuoco

== Equipment ==
The Corps of Firefighters of the Vatican City State is a modern and well-equipped national fire brigade, whose members wear protective fire-fighting uniform and helmets. They are equipped to deal with a range of fire-fighting, rescue, first aid, and civil defence scenarios. Their key equipment is a fleet of emergency vehicles, as below. All fire appliances (apart from the aerial hydraulic platform) utilise vehicle types capable of negotiating narrow streets and locations with cramped or difficult access. The principal fire tender (an Iveco Daily Magirus) and rescue tender (a Mercedes-Benz Sprinter) have specially narrow bodies to facilitate access.

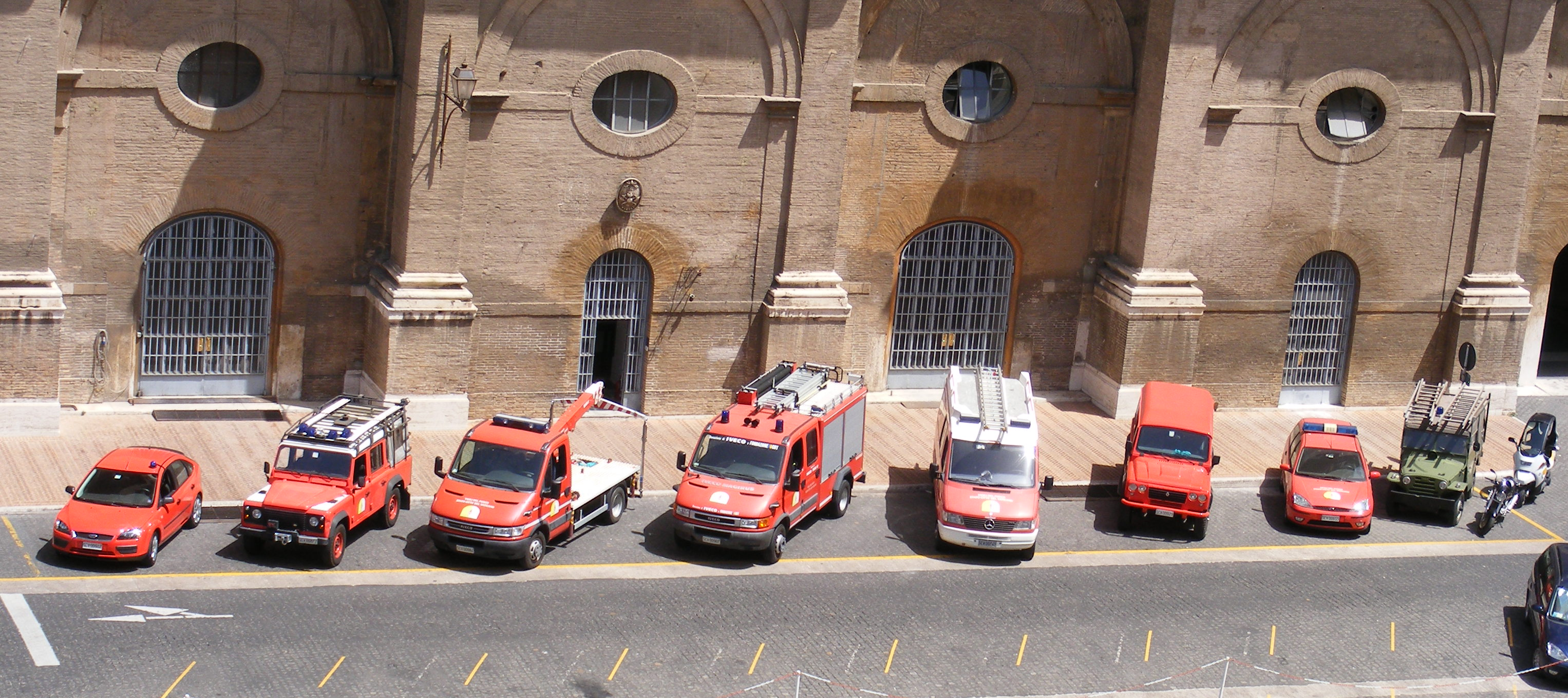
Most of the Vatican fire appliances on display (only the aerial platform is absent).

=== Front line emergency appliances ===
- Iveco Daily Magirus Falcon 1000 fire tender
- Mercedes-Benz Econic aerial hydraulic platform tender
- Mercedes-Benz Sprinter rescue tender
- Land Rover 110 4-wheel drive fire tender
- MAN water cannon TGE 6.180 heliport tender

=== Support vehicles ===
- Iveco Daily recovery truck
- Jeep personnel carrier
- Two Ford Focus liveried general purpose cars

=== Historic vehicles ===
- Fiat Campagnola general purpose appliance (still technically in service)

== See also ==
- Index of Vatican City-related articles
- Corps of Gendarmerie of Vatican City
- Swiss Guard
- List of fire departments
