= Attempted assassination of Pope John Paul II =

1981 shooting in St. Peter's Square

Coordinates: 41°54′09.5″N 12°27′24″E

Attempted assassination of John Paul II
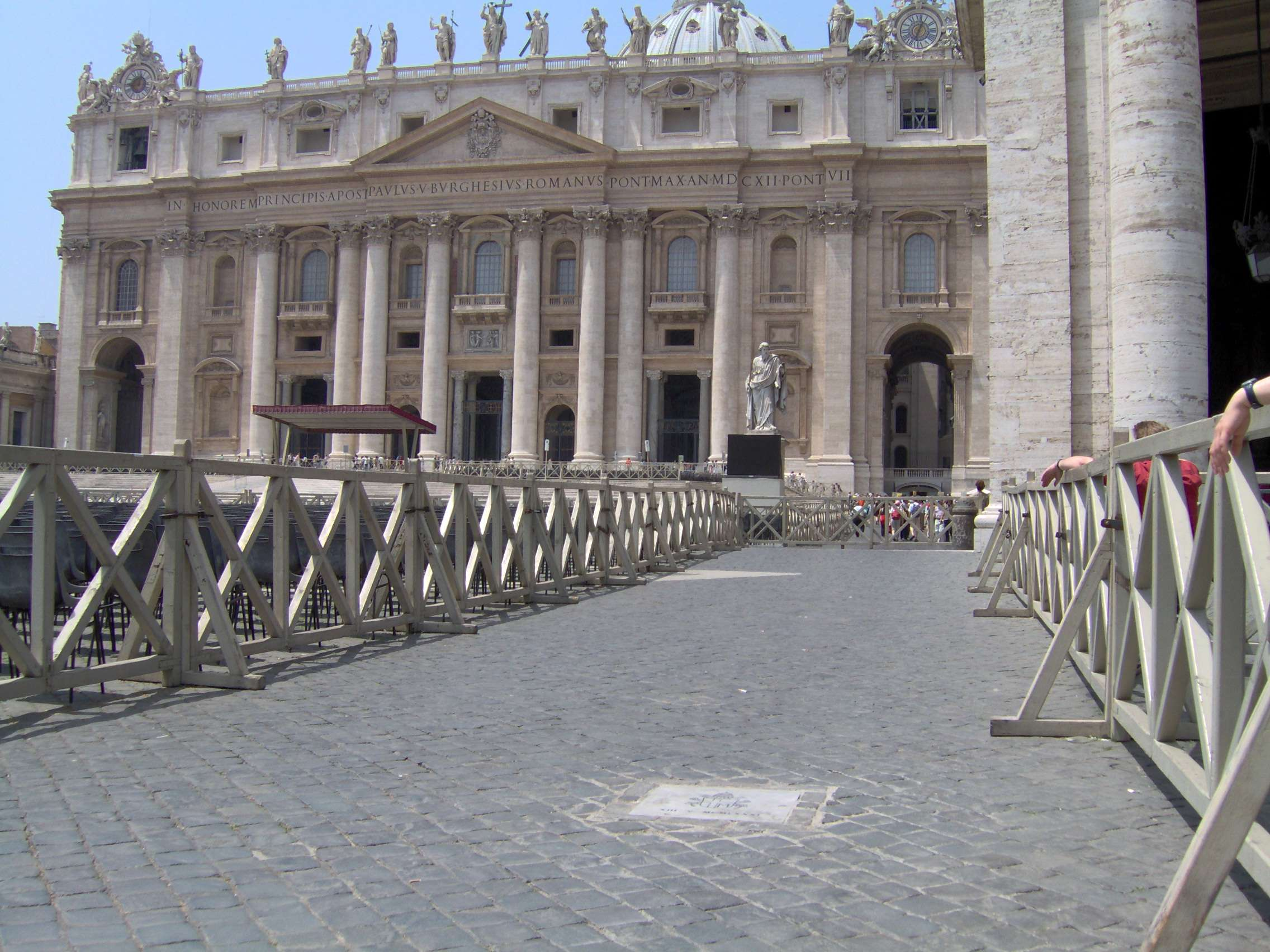
- The approximate location of the shooting, marked by a stone tablet, in St. Peter's Square
- Location: St. Peter's Square, Vatican City
- Date: 13 May 1981; 45 years ago 17:17 (CEST)
- Target: Pope John Paul II
- Attack type: Shooting
- Weapon: Browning Hi-Power
- Injuries: 3 (including the Pope)
- Perpetrator: Mehmet Ali Ağca (Grey Wolves)
- Motive: Uncertain, see "motivations"

On 13 May 1981, in St. Peter's Square in Vatican City, Pope John Paul II was shot and wounded by Mehmet Ali Ağca while he was entering the square. The Pope was struck twice and suffered severe blood loss. Ağca was apprehended immediately and later sentenced to life in prison by an Italian court. The Pope forgave Ağca for the assassination attempt. He was pardoned by Italian president Carlo Azeglio Ciampi at the Pope's request and was deported to Turkey in June 2000.

== Background ==
In 1979, The New York Times reported that Ağca, whom it called "the self-confessed killer of an Istanbul newspaperman" (Abdi İpekçi, editor of the Turkish newspaper Milliyet), had described the Pope as "the masked leader of the crusades" and threatened to shoot him if he did not cancel his planned visit to Turkey, which went ahead in late November 1979. The paper also said (on 28 November 1979) that the killing would be in revenge for the then still ongoing attack on the Grand Mosque in Mecca, which had begun on 20 November, and which he blamed on the United States or Israel.

Beginning in August 1980, Ağca, under the alias of Vilperi, began criss-crossing the Mediterranean region, altering passports and identities, perhaps to hide his point of origin in Sofia, Bulgaria. He entered Rome on 10 May 1981, coming by train from Milan. According to Ağca's later testimony, he met with three accomplices in Rome, one a fellow Turk and two Bulgarians, with the operation being commanded by Zilo Vassilev, the Bulgarian military attaché in Italy. He said that he was assigned this mission by Turkish mafioso Bekir Çelenk in Bulgaria. According to Ağca, the plan was for him and the back-up gunman Oral Çelik to open fire on the pope in St. Peter's Square and escape to the Bulgarian embassy under the cover of the panic generated by a small explosion.

== Attempted assassination ==
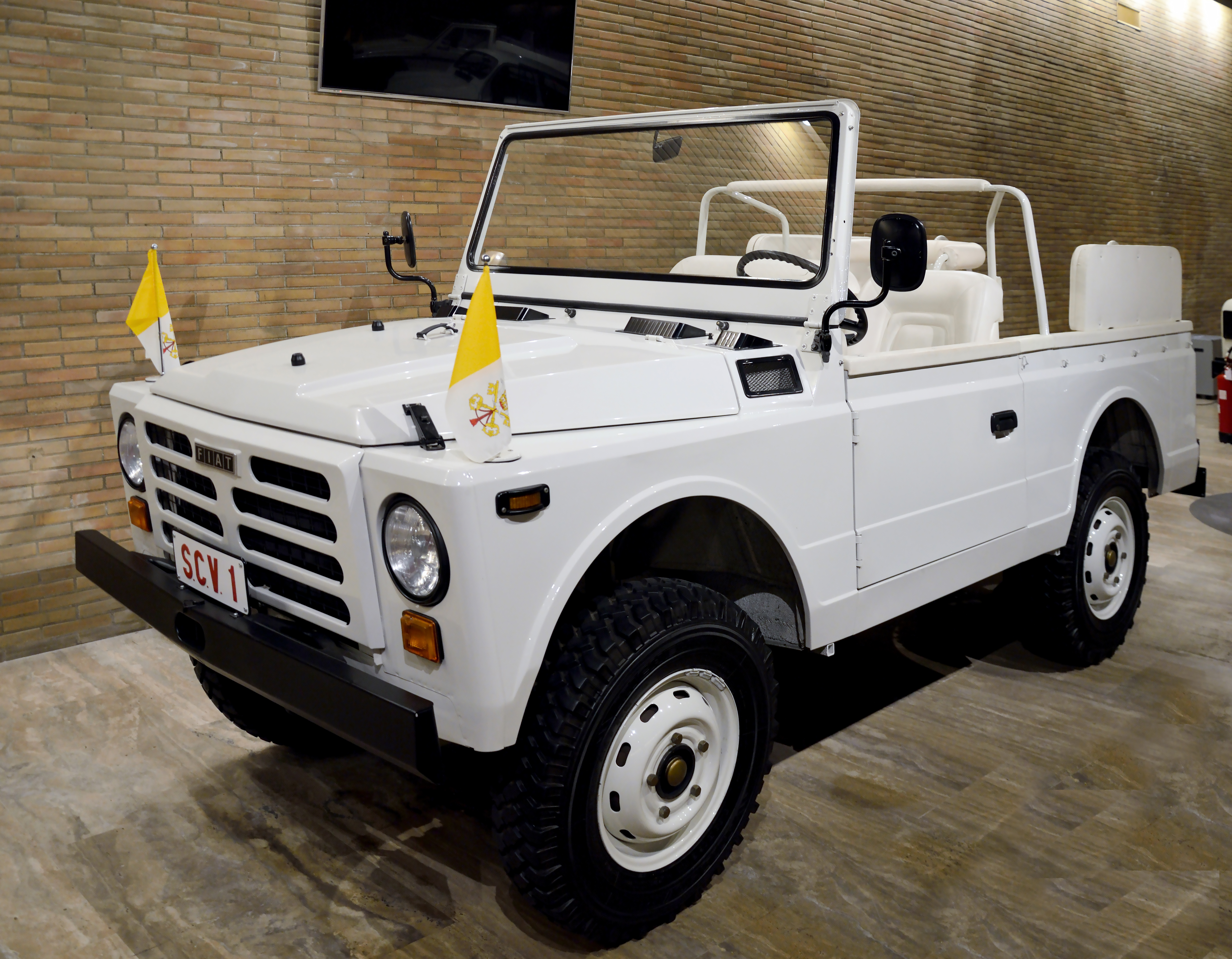
The Fiat Popemobile in which Pope John Paul II was riding at the time of the attempted assassination. This vehicle is now in the Vatican Museums.

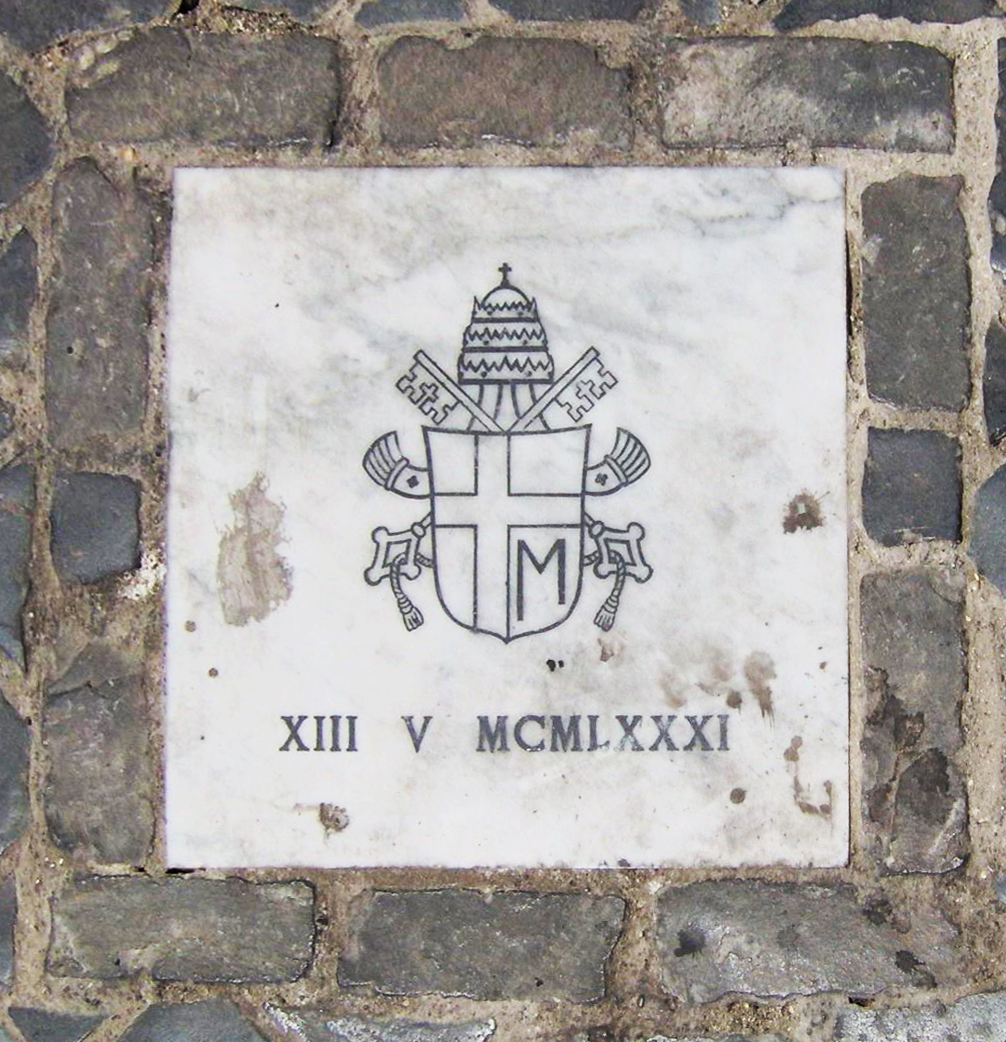
The approximate site of the shooting is marked by a small marble tablet bearing John Paul II's personal coat of arms and the date in Roman numerals.

On 13 May, Ağca was sitting in the square, writing postcards and waiting for the Pope to arrive. When the Pope passed through a crowd of supporters, Ağca fired four shots at 17:17 with a 9mm Browning Hi-Power semi-automatic pistol, and seriously wounded him. He fled the scene as the crowd was in shock and disposed of the pistol by throwing it under a truck, but was grabbed by Vatican security chief Camillo Cibin, a nun, and several spectators who prevented him from firing more shots or escaping, and he was arrested. Two bullets hit John Paul II: one struck his torso, narrowly missing vital organs, and a second hit his left index finger. Two bystanders were also injured: Ann Odre, of Buffalo, New York, was struck in the chest, and Rose Hall, of Massachusetts, was slightly wounded in the arm. The Pope was immediately rushed to the hospital while the authorities combed the site for evidence. Çelik panicked and fled without opening fire.

=== Health effects ===
The 1981 assassination attempt of Pope John Paul II had a significant impact on his health, the extent to which was unknown by the general public at the time. Rushed to the Agostino Gemelli University Polyclinic to undergo emergency surgery, the pope experienced profound bleeding leading to a dangerous fall in blood pressure and to cardiac arrest, which was successfully defibrillated. He received the Anointing of the Sick (formerly known as "Last Rites"). Despite difficulties with extensive blood transfusions, which are speculated to have transmitted a cytomegalovirus (CMV) infection, the surgery was eventually successful. A bullet had passed completely through the body, puncturing the intestines and necessitating a colostomy. Seven weeks later, discussions were held about reversing the colostomy and eight of nine doctors voted against it, arguing the pope was still too weak from the CMV infection. Saying "I don't want to continue half dead and half alive", the pope effectively overruled his physicians and the reversal was done successfully on August 5, 1981. The operation was performed by Francesco Crucitti, the personal surgeon of the Pope. He also lead the team of surgeons that performed surgery on the Pope on the day of the assassination attempt.

== Incarceration of Ağca ==
Ağca was sentenced in July 1981 to life imprisonment for the assassination attempt, but was pardoned by Italian president Carlo Azeglio Ciampi in June 2000 at the Pope's request. He was then extradited to Turkey, where he was imprisoned for the 1979 murder of left-wing journalist Abdi İpekçi and two bank raids carried out in the 1970s. Despite a plea for early release in November 2004, a Turkish court announced that he would not be eligible for release until 2010. Nonetheless, he was released on parole on 12 January 2006. However, on 20 January 2006, the Turkish Supreme Court ruled that his time served in Italy could not be deducted from his Turkish sentence and he was returned to jail. Ağca was released from prison on 18 January 2010, after almost 29 years behind bars.

== Relationship with Pope John Paul II ==
Following the shooting, Pope John Paul II asked people to "pray for my brother [Ağca] ... whom I have sincerely forgiven." In 1983, he and Ağca met and spoke privately at Rome's Rebibbia Prison, where Ağca was being held. Ağca reportedly kissed the Pope's ring at the conclusion of their visit; some mistakenly thought the Pope was hearing Ağca's confession. The Pope was also in touch with Ağca's family over the years, meeting his mother in 1987 and his brother, Muezzin Ağca, a decade later.

Despite Ağca's assassination attempt, and being quoted as saying that "to me [the Pope] was the incarnation of all that is capitalism" and attempted to murder him, Ağca developed a friendship with the pontiff. In early February 2005, during the Pope's illness, Ağca sent a letter to the Pope wishing him well.

In 2014, 33 years after his crime, Ağca visited Vatican City to lay white roses on the tomb of the recently canonised John Paul II, and said he wanted to meet Pope Francis, a request that was denied.

== Motivations for the assassination attempt ==
Several theories exist concerning Ağca's assassination attempt. One, which was initially propagated in the American media and strongly advocated since the early 1980s by Michael Ledeen and Claire Sterling among others, was that the assassination attempt had originated from Moscow and that the KGB had instructed the Bulgarian and East German secret services to carry out the mission. The Bulgarian Secret Service was allegedly instructed by the KGB to assassinate the Pope because of his support of Poland's Solidarity movement, seeing it as one of the most significant threats to Soviet hegemony in Eastern Europe. Noam Chomsky and Edward S. Herman instead term this as the spread of "disinformation as news" in their book Manufacturing Consent (1988), as they say there was no evidence to support this claim, while Wolfgang Achtner of The Independent dubbed it "one of the most successful cases—certainly the most publicized—of disinformation."

Ağca himself has given multiple conflicting statements on the assassination at different times. Attorney Antonio Marini stated: "Ağca has manipulated all of us, telling hundreds of lies, continually changing versions, forcing us to open tens of different investigations." Originally, Ağca claimed to be a member of the Marxist Popular Front for the Liberation of Palestine (PFLP), but they denied any ties to him.

=== "Bulgarian Connection" ===
Following the assassination attempt, Ağca made claims while in custody that prior to the attempt, he had made several trips to Sofia, Bulgaria, where he claimed to have had contacts with a Bulgarian agent in Rome whose cover was the Bulgarian national airline office. Soon after the shooting, Sergei Antonov, a Bulgarian working in Rome for Balkan Air, was arrested based on Ağca's testimony and accused of being the Bulgarian agent who masterminded the plot. In 1986, after a three-year trial, he was found not guilty.

According to the CIA's chief of staff in Turkey, Paul Henze, Ağca later stated that in Sofia, he was once approached by the Bulgarian Secret Service and Turkish mafiosi, who offered him three million German marks to assassinate the Pope. Some writers, including Edward S. Herman, co-author with Frank Brodhead of The Rise and Fall of the Bulgarian Connection (1986), and Michael Parenti, believed Ağca's story was dubious as Ağca made no claims of Bulgarian involvement until he had been isolated in solitary confinement and visited by Italian Military Intelligence (SISMI) agents. On 25 September 1991, former CIA analyst Melvin A. Goodman (now Senior Fellow at the Center for International Policy) claimed that his colleagues, following orders, had falsified their analysis to support the accusation. He declared to the US Senate intelligence committee that "the CIA hadn't any proof" concerning this alleged "Bulgarian connection".

Neither the Severino Santiapichi court nor the investigation by Judge Franco Ionta found evidence that SISMI planted Ağca's story. A French lawyer, Christian Roulette, who authored books blaming Western intelligence agencies for the assassination attempt, testified in court that the documentary evidence he referred to actually did not exist.

=== Grey Wolves ===
Le Monde diplomatique alleged that Abdullah Çatlı, a leader of the Grey Wolves, had organised the assassination attempt "in exchange for the sum of 3 million German Marks" for the Grey Wolves.

In Rome, Çatlı declared to the judge in 1985 "that he had been contacted by the BND, the German intelligence agency, which would have promised him a nice sum of money if he implicated the Russian and Bulgarian services in the assassination attempt against the Pope". According to Colonel Alparslan Türkeş, the founder of the Grey Wolves, "Çatlı has cooperated in the frame of a secret service working for the good of the state".

=== Mitrokhin Commission's claims ===
According to Italian newspaper Corriere della Sera, documents recovered from former East German intelligence services confirm the 1981 assassination attempt against Pope John Paul II was ordered by the Soviet KGB and assigned to Bulgarian and East German agents with the Stasi to coordinate the operation and cover up the traces afterwards. Markus Wolf, former Stasi spy-master, denied any links, and stated that the files had already been sent in 1995.

In March 2006, pending the 2006 Italian general election held in April, the controversial Mitrokhin Commission, set up by Silvio Berlusconi and headed by Forza Italia senator Paolo Guzzanti, supported once again the Bulgarian theory, which John Paul II had denounced during his travel to Bulgaria. Guzzanti stated that "leaders of the former Soviet Union were behind the assassination attempt", alleging that "the leadership of the Soviet Union took the initiative to eliminate Pope John Paul" because of his support for Solidarity, relaying "this decision to the military secret services" and not the KGB. The report's claims were based on recent computer analysis of photographs that purported to demonstrate Antonov's presence in St Peter's Square during the shooting and on information brought by the French anti-terrorist judge Jean-Louis Bruguière, a controversial figure whose last feat was to indict Rwandese president Paul Kagame, on the grounds that he had deliberately provoked the 1994 Rwandan genocide against his own ethnic group in order to take power. According to Le Figaro, Bruguière, who was in close contacts with both Moscow and Washington, D.C., including intelligence agents, was accused by many of his colleagues of "privileging the reason of state over law".

Both Russia and Bulgaria condemned the report. Foreign ministry spokesman Dimiter Tzantchev said: "For Bulgaria, this case closed with the court decision in Rome in March 1986.", He recalled the Pope's dismissive comments during his May 2002 visit to Bulgaria. Guzzanti said that the commission had decided to re-open the report's chapter on the assassination attempt in 2005, after the Pope wrote about it in his last book, Memory and Identity. The Pope wrote that he was convinced the shooting was not Ağca's initiative and that "someone else masterminded it and someone else commissioned it". The Mitrokhin Commission also alleged Romano Prodi, a former Prime Minister of Italy, was the "KGB's man in Italy".

At the end of December 2006, Mario Scaramella, one of Guzzanti's main informers, was arrested and charged, among other things, with defamation. Cited by La Repubblica, Rome's prosecutor Pietro Salvitti, who was in charge of the investigations concerning Scaramella, showed that Nicolò Pollari, head of SISMI, the Italian military intelligence agency and indicted in the Abu Omar case, as well as SISMI no 2, Marco Mancini, who arrested in July 2006 for the same reason, were some of the informers, alongside Scaramella, of Guzzanti. According to Salvitti, beside targeting Prodi and his staff, this network also aimed at defaming General Giuseppe Cucchi (the then director of the CESIS), Milan's judges Armando Spataro, in charge of the Abu Omar case, and Guido Salvini, as well as La Repubblica reporters Carlo Bonini and Giuseppe D'Avanzo, who discovered the Yellowcake forgery affair. The investigation also showed a connection between Scaramella and the CIA, in particular through Filippo Marino, one of Scaramella's closest partners since the 1990s and co-founder of the Environmental Crime Prevention Program, who came to live in the United States. In an interview, Marino acknowledged an association with former and active CIA officers, including Robert Lady, former CIA station chief in Milan, indicted by prosecutor Armando Spataro for having coordinated the abduction of Hassan Mustafa Osama Nasr that led to the Abu Omar case.

=== Spies in the Vatican ===
In 2009, journalist and former U.S. Army military intelligence officer John O. Koehler published Spies in the Vatican: The Soviet Union's Cold War Against the Catholic Church. Mining mostly East German and Polish secret police archives, Koehler claims the attempt was "KGB-backed" and gives details.

== Fatima and possible Vatican connection ==
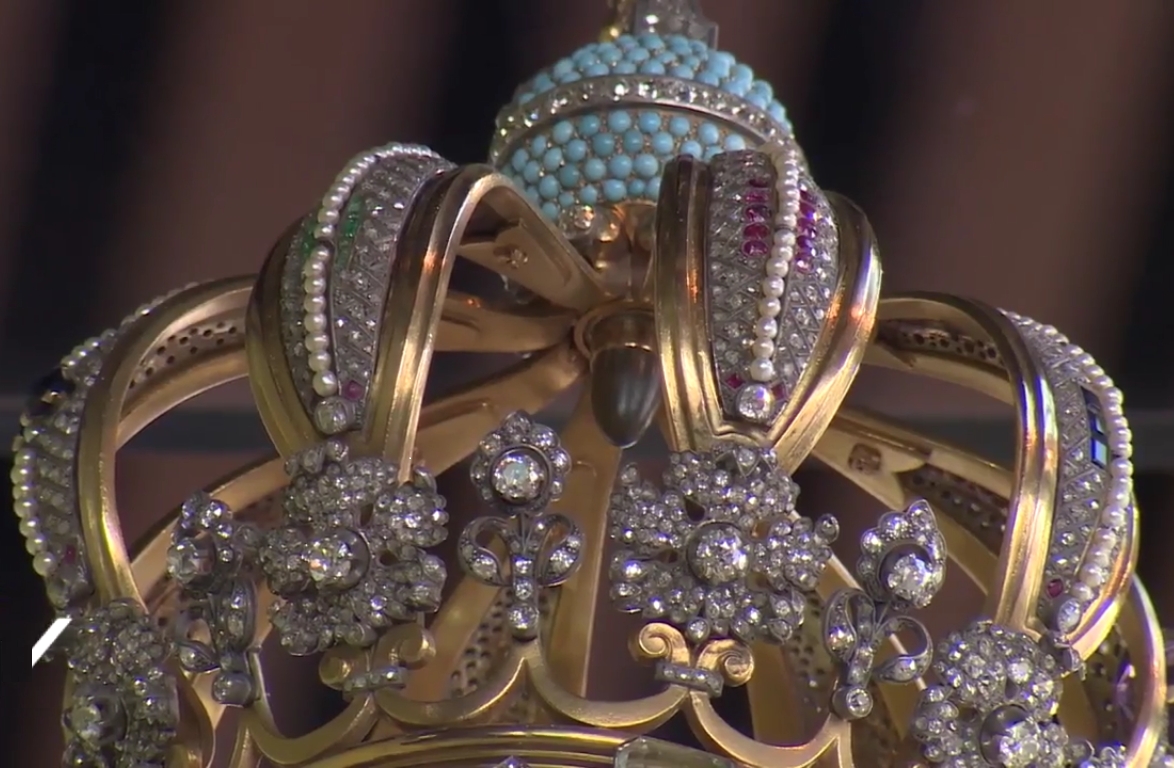
One of the bullets that struck Pope John Paul II in 1981 was later encased in the crown of the image of Our Lady of Fatima, in the Sanctuary of Fatima, Portugal.

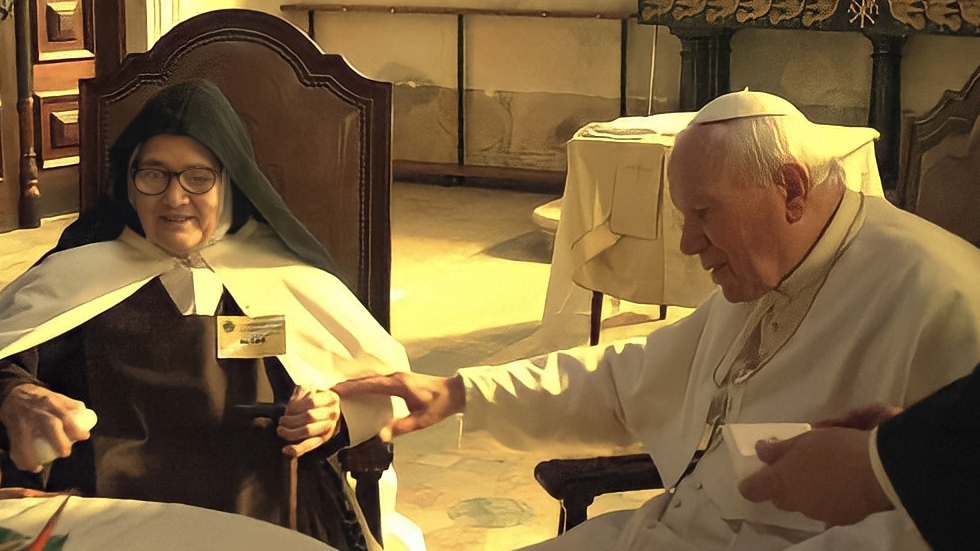
Meeting of Sister Lúcia with Pope John Paul II in the Sanctuary of Fatima, Portugal, on 13 May 2000.

The date of the attempted assassination, 13 May 1981, was the 64th anniversary of the first apparition of the Virgin Mary to the children at Fatima, Portugal (13 May 1917). On 13 May 2000, Cardinal Angelo Sodano gave a public address in which he linked the then-as-yet-unreleased Third Secret of Fatima to the assassination attempt: while describing the Secret as a "prophetic vision" which does "not describe with photographic clarity the details of future events," he also identified the prophecy's "Bishop clothed in white" as the Pope, and repeated John Paul II's impression that "a motherly hand" had deflected Ağca's bullets. The Vatican revealed the text of the Third Secret itself the same year, on 26 June 2000.

While in prison on remand, Ağca was widely reported to have developed an obsession with Fatima. During the trial Ağca claimed that he was the second coming of Jesus Christ, and called on the Vatican to release the Third Secret. (His assassination attempt had also come only 11 days after the hijacking of Aer Lingus Flight 164 by Laurence James Downey, an ex-monk, who demanded the release of the Third Secret.)

On 31 March 2005, just two days prior to the Pope's death, Ağca gave an interview to the Italian newspaper La Repubblica. He claimed to be working on a book about the assassination attempt. La Repubblica quoted Ağca claiming at length that he had accomplices in the Vatican who helped him with the assassination attempt, saying "the devil is inside Vatican's wall". He also said:

Many calculating politicians are worried about what revealing the complete truth would do. Some of them fear that the Vatican will have a spiritual collapse like the Berlin Wall. Let me ask, why don't the CIA, the SISMI, the SISDE, and other intelligence agencies reveal the truth about the Orlandi case?

Q: They say it's because there is still some uncertainty in the Emanuela Orlandi case.

Ağca: In the 1980s, certain Vatican supporters believed that I was the new messiah and to free me they organised all the intrigue about Emanuela Orlandi and the other incidents they won't reveal.

Emanuela Orlandi, the daughter of a Vatican employee, disappeared at age 15 on 22 June 1983. Anonymous phone calls offered her release in exchange for the release of Ağca. Archbishop Paul Marcinkus was alleged to be part of the kidnapping, although no charges were ever laid.

Ağca subsequently denied having made such claims following the publication of the interview. In 2010 Ağca asserted that Cardinal Agostino Casaroli had been behind the assassination attempt. However, when Ağca published his memoirs in 2013, his story changed completely, writing that the Iranian government and supreme leader Ayatollah Khomeini ordered the assassination attempt on John Paul II.

== In fiction ==
The A. J. Quinnell novel In the Name of the Father describes the aftermath of the plot to assassinate the Pope. Church leaders are shocked to discover that the attempt was orchestrated by the highest levels of the Kremlin.

On the online timeline of the 2004 alternate history mockumentary C.S.A.: The Confederate States of America, in which the Confederate States of America wins the American Civil War and annexes the rest of the United States, an assassination attempt on Pope John Paul II still occurs. However, it occurs in New York City rather than in St. Peter's Square. The assailant, a Baptist from Tennessee named Maynard Brimley, shoots the Pope and kills a bystander. Although the Pope visits Brimley in prison to forgive him for his actions, Brimley is tried and executed, partly to appease international pressure.

The Tom Clancy novel Red Rabbit incorporates the assassination attempt, following the "Moscow origin" theory.

== See also ==
- Juan María Fernández y Krohn
- Islamokemalism
- Bojinka Plot

== Further viewing ==
- Jon Blair (2005). Zero Hour – The Plot to Kill the Pope. 3BM Television.
- Meissen, Randall J. Living Miracles: The Spiritual Sons of John Paul the Great, Alpharetta, GA, Mission Network: 2011. Several sections of this work discuss the assassination, its cultural impact on Catholic seminarians, and the protection of the pope attributed to Our Lady of Fatima.
