= Juan María Fernández y Krohn =

Attempted assassin of Pope John Paul II (born c. 1948)

The Reverend Juan María Fernández y Krohn
- Born: c. 1948 (age 77–78); Madrid, Spain
- Occupations: Journalist; lawyer; priest
- Known for: Attempted assassination of Pope John Paul II

Juan María Fernández y Krohn (born c. 1948) is a Spanish journalist, lawyer and former priest who attempted to assassinate Pope John Paul II in 1982.

== Early life ==
Fernández y Krohn was born c. 1948 in Madrid, the son of a middle-class Andalusian family with distant Norwegian ancestors. He successfully studied at the Escuelas Pías in Madrid's Argüelles district. At age 17, he began studying economics at the Complutense University of Madrid. At the beginning of his studies he joined the syndicalist and Falangist fraternity Frente de Estudiantes Sindicalistas (FES) and acted as an activist on the progressive wing of the group. He graduated with very good results. After turning away from his former political activities, he increasingly took on anti-communist and integralist positions and visited various places of Marian apparitions.

== Priestly activity ==
In 1975, Fernández y Krohn came to Écône in the Swiss canton of Valais to contact the Priestly Fraternity of St. Pius X. In Argentina and later Brazil, he continued to come in contact with integralist communities. In 1978, Fernández y Krohn was ordained to the priesthood by the Traditionalist archbishop and founder of the FSSPX Marcel Lefebvre. As a pastor, Fernández y Krohn looked after two congregations of the FSSPX near Paris and in Rouen.

The FSSPX was founded in 1970 to adhere to the rites and disciplines of the Roman Catholic Church from before the Second Vatican Council (1962-1965).

In 1979, Fernández y Krohn was expelled for having shown "signs of mental instability" and criticizing Archbishop Lefebvre for his allegedly too weak opposition to the pope. According to the Brotherhood, Fernández y Krohn separated from Lefebvre in 1980 and joined a Sedevacantist group.

In July 1981, he traveled to Poland, trying unsuccessfully to conduct an interview with Lech Wałęsa, the founder of the Solidarity trade union.

== Assassination attempt on Pope John Paul II ==
On 12 May 1982, Fernández y Krohn assaulted Pope John Paul II with a bayonet in Fátima, Portugal, on the occasion of the Pope's pilgrimage to give thanks for his life being spared one year earlier at St. Peter's Square in the attack by the assassin Mehmet Ali Ağca.

Fernández y Krohn arose from the crowd in a cassock, approached the pope from behind, and called out "Down with the Pope, down with the Second Vatican Council". He then stabbed John Paul II with the 40 cm-long (16 in) bayonet of a Mauser rifle. An aide of the pope stated that he did wound him, as there was blood on the floor when they returned to the Vatican.

John Paul II survived the attack, and blessed the failed assassin. Fernández y Krohn was arrested by security without resistance.

== Prosecution ==
Juan María Fernández y Krohn had to answer for the murder attempt both under canon law and under Portuguese criminal law.

Fernández y Krohn was convicted of attempted murder, and sentenced to six and a half years imprisonment. He received a further seven months in prison for contempt of court. During his trial, he said that he was opposed to the reforms of Vatican II and that he believed Pope John Paul II had been in league with the Soviet Union, accusing him of being a secret Communist agent trying to infiltrate the Vatican. He has said he had not hurt the pope. After spending three years in a Lisbon prison, Fernández y Krohn was released in 1985, and deported.

As a member of the Roman Catholic Church (at the time), the perpetrator, according to Canons 1331 and 1370 § 1 of the Church code, incurred the Church penalty of excommunication. In the case of the use of force against the pope, the penalty comes into effect directly, without trial. Due to the excommunication, Fernández y Krohn lost the right to receive or confer the sacraments until he could be reconciled in confession. After his excommunication, he ceased to be a member of the Catholic Church according to the Vatican.

== Other criminal activities ==
In 1996, Fernández y Krohn was charged with arson in the Brussels branch of the separatist Basque party Herri Batasuna; he was found not guilty of all charges.

In July 2000, during a visit of Juan Carlos I of Spain to King Albert II of Belgium, Fernández y Krohn, as an enraged protester, breached security and attempted to approach the kings. Fernández y Krohn was charged and convicted for disturbing the peace, and was sentenced to four months imprisonment. The subsequent psychiatric study determined that there was no danger and Fernández y Krohn was released.

== Personal life ==
After his expulsion from Portugal, Fernández y Krohn went to Belgium, where he abandoned the priesthood, married a Portuguese journalist, worked as a lawyer, and became a blogger. There he came to additional notoriety where "he gained a bad reputation when he smacked a judge and handed out anti-semitic literature in the Brussels Palace of Justice".

After 2000, he has lived between Belgium and Spain, and is reported to be an expert in art and literature of the post-Spanish Civil War period from 1939–1990. He has a son from a relationship with a Flemish Belgian.

He has described his assassination attempt against the Pope as a "sacrifice" for the salvation of the Church, Spain and his conviction as a "National Catholic". He said he was not insane and did not regret his act, even if he did not repeat it, because he had evolved. He described himself as a sinner, but said he had not committed a crime. He accused the assassin Mehmet Ali Ağca of being anti-Christian and anti-Western and of holding the pope as the leader of the crusades. Fernández y Krohn further said that John Paul II never forgave him, unlike Ağca.

== See also ==
- Benjamín Mendoza y Amor Flores, attempted assassin of Paul VI
- Attempted assassination of Pope John Paul II
- Bojinka plot
