= Mehmet Ali Ağca =

Turkish assassin (born 1958)

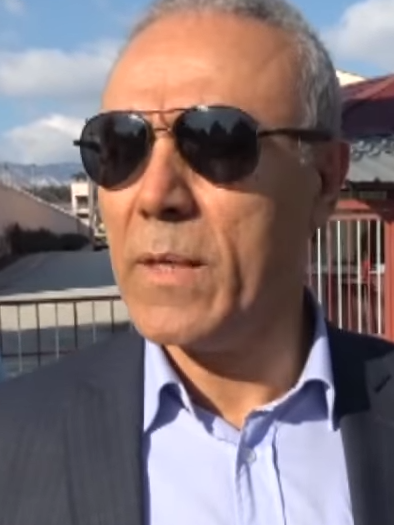
- Ağca in 2017
- Born: 9 January 1958 (age 68); Hekimhan, Malatya, Turkey
- Organization: Grey Wolves (formerly)
- Status: Pardoned in Italy, paroled in Turkey
- Convictions: Abdi İpekçi's murder and the assassination attempt on Pope John Paul II
- Penalty: Life imprisonment in Italy (served 19 years); Death penalty and various lengths of imprisonment in Turkey (served 10 years)

Details
- Killed: Abdi İpekçi
- Injured: Pope John Paul II

Mehmet Ali Ağca (Turkish: [mehˈmet aˈli ˈaːdʒa]; born 9 January 1958) is a Turkish former hitman for the Grey Wolves. On 1 February 1979, he murdered journalist Abdi İpekçi, known for his leftist views, and was imprisoned, but escaped. He travelled illegally to Vatican City on 13 May 1981 and attempted to assassinate Pope John Paul II on the same day. However, the assassination attempt failed, and he was captured and imprisoned by the Italian police.

After being imprisoned for 19 years in Italy where he was visited by the Pope, he was deported to Turkey, where he served a ten-year sentence. Ağca was released from prison on 18 January 2010. He described himself as a mercenary with no political orientation, although he is known to have been a member of the Turkist far-right organisation Grey Wolves, as well as the state-sponsored Counter-Guerrilla.

In 2014, 33 years after his crime, Ağca visited Vatican City to lay white roses on the tomb of the recently canonised John Paul II, and said he wanted to meet Pope Francis, a request that was denied.

== Early life ==
Mehmet Ali Ağca was born on 9 January 1958 in Hekimhan in a poor Turkish peasant family.

As a youth, he became a petty criminal and a member of numerous street gangs in his hometown. He became a smuggler between Turkey and Bulgaria. He claims to have received two months of training in weaponry and terrorist tactics in Syria as a member of the Marxist Popular Front for the Liberation of Palestine (PFLP) paid for by the Communist Bulgarian government, although the PFLP has denied this.

== Grey Wolves involvement ==
After training, Ağca went to work for the ultranationalist Turkish organization Grey Wolves. On 1 February 1979, in Istanbul, under orders from the Grey Wolves, he murdered Abdi İpekçi, editor of the major Turkish newspaper Milliyet. After being denounced by an informant, he was caught on 25 June 1979 and sentenced to life in prison. On 25 November 1979, after serving five months, he escaped with the help of Abdullah Çatlı, second-in-command of the Grey Wolves, and fled to Bulgaria, which was a base of operations for the Turkish mafia. According to investigative journalist Lucy Komisar, Ağca had worked on İpekçi's assassination with Çatlı, who then reportedly helped organize Ağca's escape from an Istanbul military prison. According to Komisar, some have suggested Çatlı was even involved in the Pope's assassination attempt. According to Reuters, Ağca had escaped with suspected help from sympathizers in the security services. Komisar added that at the scene of the Mercedes-Benz crash where Çatlı died, he was found with a passport under the name of "Mehmet Özbay" – an alias also used by Ağca.

== Attempted assassination of Pope John Paul II ==
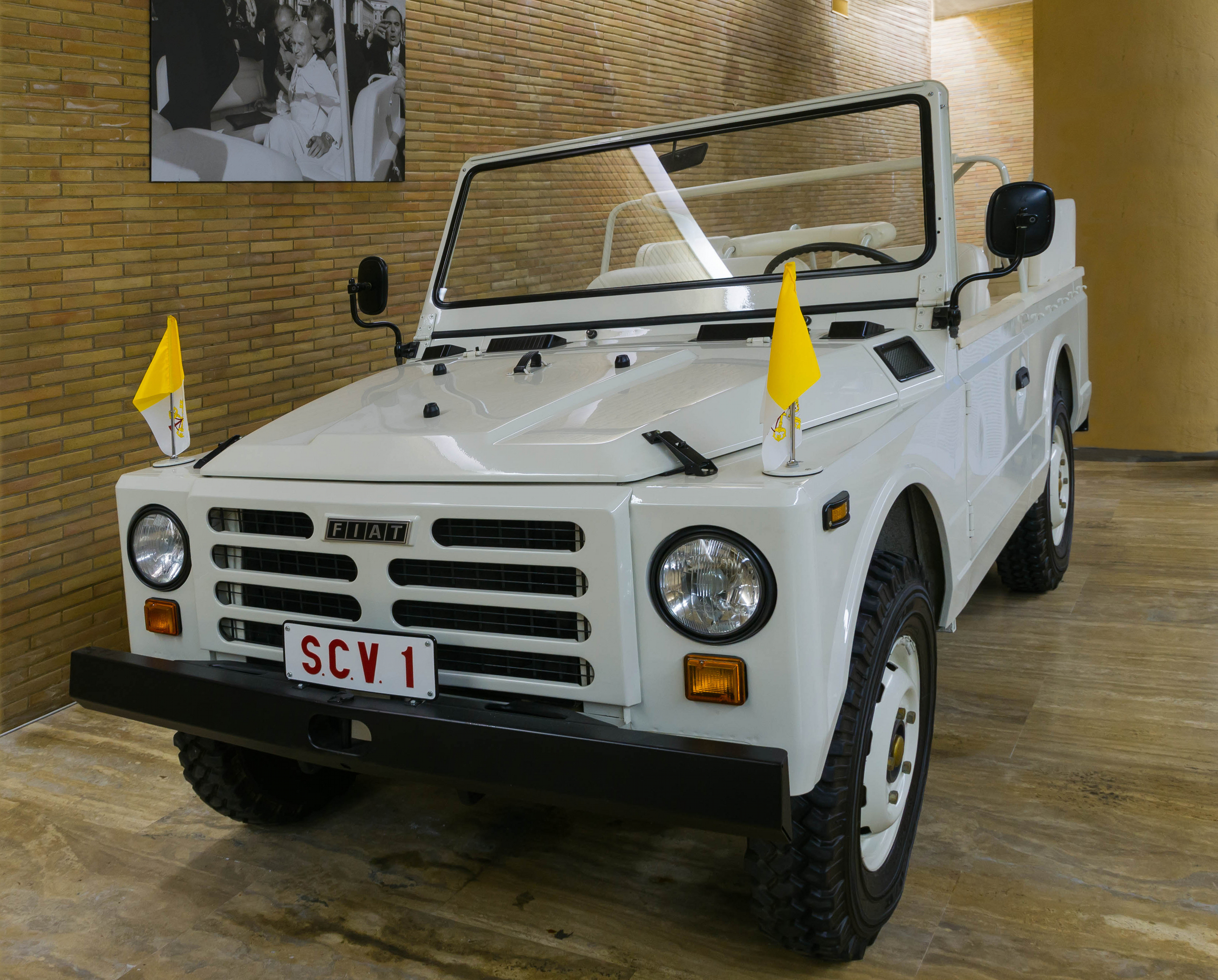
The Fiat Popemobile in which Pope John Paul II was the subject of an assassination attempt. This vehicle is now in the "Carriage museum" in Vatican City.

In 1979, The New York Times reported that Ağca, whom it called "the self-confessed killer of an Istanbul newspaperman", had described the Pope as "the masked leader of the Crusades" and threatened to shoot him if he did not cancel his planned visit to Turkey, which went ahead in late November 1979. The paper also said (on 28 November 1979) that the killing would be in revenge for the then still ongoing attack on the Grand Mosque in Mecca, which had begun on 20 November, and which he blamed on the United States or Israel.

Beginning in August 1980, Ağca began criss-crossing the Mediterranean region. According to his later testimony, he met with three accomplices in Rome, one a fellow Turk and the other two Bulgarians. The operation was commanded by Zilo Vassilev, the Bulgarian military attaché in Italy. (Note: Ali Agca claimed he was under directions from the Bulgarian embassy in Rome and allegedly Stasi archives of letters from Stasi operatives to their Bulgarian counterparts seeking help in covering up traces after the attack verified this according to Corriere della Sera.) He said that he was assigned this mission by Turkish mafioso Bekir Çelenk in Bulgaria. Le Monde diplomatique, however, has alleged that the assassination attempt was organized by Abdullah Çatlı "in exchange for the sum of 3 million marks", paid by Bekir Çelenk to the Grey Wolves.

According to Ağca, the plan was for him and the back-up gunman Oral Çelik to open fire in St. Peter's Square and escape to the Bulgarian embassy under the cover of the panic generated by a small explosion. On 13 May they sat in the Square, writing postcards and waiting for the Pope to arrive. When the Pope passed them, Ağca fired several shots and wounded him, but was grabbed by spectators and Vatican security chief Camillo Cibin. This prevented him from finishing the assassination or escaping. Two bullets hit John Paul II, one of them lodging in his lower intestine, the other hitting his left hand. Two bystanders were also hit. Çelik panicked and fled without setting off his bomb or opening fire. The Pope survived the assassination attempt.

== Prison time, release, and rearrest ==
Ağca was sentenced on 23 July 1981 to life imprisonment in Italy for the assassination attempt. Following his shooting, Pope John Paul II asked people to "pray for my brother (Ağca), whom I have sincerely forgiven." In 1983, the Pope and Ağca met and spoke privately at the prison where Ağca was being held. The Pope was also in touch with Ağca's family over the years, meeting his mother in 1987 and his brother a decade later. After he was imprisoned, Ağca announced that he had left Islam and converted to Christianity.

Ağca's release was requested in the summer of 1983 by the alleged kidnappers of Emanuela Orlandi, the young daughter of a Vatican employee, who mysteriously disappeared in Rome in June of that year. On 9 June 1997, Air Malta Flight 830 was hijacked by two men. After landing in Cologne, the hijackers demanded the release of Ağca. He was not released and the hijackers surrendered. After serving almost 20 years of a life sentence in prison in Italy, at the request of Pope John Paul II, Ağca was pardoned by the then Italian president Carlo Azeglio Ciampi in June 2000 and deported to Turkey.

Following his extradition, he was imprisoned for the 1979 murder of Abdi İpekçi and for two bank raids carried out in the 1970s. Ağca was arrested on 25 June and incarcerated in the Maltepe Military Prison. He fled to Bulgaria on 25 November and was sentenced to death in absentia. Ağca was extradited to Turkey in 2000 by benefiting from the Conditional Amnesty Law. This consideration granted to Ağca elicited strong reactions. Both cases were merged and tried before the Kadıköy 1st High Criminal Court. The single trial concerned the hijacking of Cengiz Aydos's taxi in 1979, robbing the Yıldırım jewellery store in Kızıltoprak on 22 March 1979 and stealing money from the Fruko soda storage on 4 April 1979. On 18 January 2000, the judges dismissed the charges because of the statute of limitations on the case filed for the jewellery store robbery and for "breach of the Firearms Act" (law no. 6136). For embezzlement and money theft Ağca was sentenced to 36 years of imprisonment. Ağca's lawyers applied for his release under Law no. 4516 on Parole and Deferral of Penalties in December 2000. Their request was denied by the 1st High Criminal Court of Kartal. The lawyers filed an appeal against this decision, but the appeals court upheld the ruling. Ağca's life sentence was reduced to 10 years under a Turkish law that shortened prison sentences if served in a foreign prison. The money-laundering conviction and 36-year sentence were overturned because of the statute of limitations for robbery, which was seven years under Turkish law.

In early February 2005, during the Pope's final illness, Ağca sent a letter to the Pope wishing him well and also warning him that the world would end soon. When the Pope died on 2 April 2005, Ağca's brother Adnan gave an interview in which he said that Ağca and his entire family were grieving, and that the Pope had been a great friend to them.

Ağca was released on parole on 12 January 2006. Mustafa Demirbağ, his lawyer, explained his release as a combination of amnesty and penal reform: an amnesty in 2000 deducted 10 years from his time, the court then deducted his 20 years in the Italian prison based on a new article in the penal code, and so he became eligible for parole for good behaviour. However, a report from the French AFP news agency stated that "The Turkish judicial authorities still haven't explained exactly which legal resources he had access to", and former Minister of Justice Hikmet Sami Türk, in government at the time of Ağca's extradition, claimed that, from a legal viewpoint, his release was a "serious mistake" at best, and that he should have not been freed before 2012. However, on 20 January 2006, the Turkish Supreme Court ruled that his time served in Italy could not be deducted from his Turkish sentence and he was again imprisoned.

== Later developments and release ==
On 2 May 2008, Ağca asked to be awarded Polish citizenship as he wished to spend the final years of his life in Poland, Pope John Paul II's country of birth. Ağca stated that upon his release he wanted to visit Pope John Paul II's tomb and partner with Dan Brown on writing a book.

Ağca was released from jail on 18 January 2010. He was transferred to a military hospital in order to assess if, at 52, he was still fit for compulsory military service. The military found him unfit for military service for having "antisocial personality disorder". In a statement, he announced: "I will meet you in the next three days. In the name of God Almighty, I proclaim the end of the world in this century. All the world will be destroyed, every human being will die. I am not God, I am not son of God, I am Christ eternal."

Ağca visited the tomb of John Paul II on 27 December 2014. He desired to become a Catholic priest in 2016 and go to Fátima, Portugal to celebrate the 100th anniversary of the Marian apparitions there (Our Lady of Fátima).

In November 2025, Ağca visited İznik in an attempt to meet with Pope Leo XIV ahead of the latter's visit but was removed by authorities.

== Claims of external involvement ==
In November 2010, Ağca accused Cardinal Agostino Casaroli of being the mastermind behind the assassination attempt on John Paul II. It has also been alleged that the Soviet Union's KGB ordered the assassination because of John Paul II's support for the Solidarity labor movement in Poland. Ağca stated this during one of his interrogations before trial.

When Ağca published his memoirs in 2013, his story changed completely, writing that the Iranian government and Ayatollah Ruhollah Khomeini ordered the assassination attempt on John Paul II. According to this new version of the events, Ağca received instructions and training in weapons and explosives in Iran from the Islamic Revolutionary Guard Corps and Mohsen Rezaei, under the orders of Ja'far Sobhani and Khomeini. In his book, Ağca acknowledges that he lied previously about the Bulgarian and Soviet connection. He stayed in Sofia for about a month but was not in contact with any Bulgarian or other intelligence officers. In transit from Turkey to Western Europe, he was delayed in Sofia because his fake Indian passport was of such poor quality that on several occasions he had to bribe officials who became suspicious. So, he waited to receive a much better-quality Turkish passport from the Grey Wolves: a genuine passport issued by the Turkish government to another person, Faruk Özgün, only the photo of Özgün was replaced by a photo of Ağca.

When Pope John Paul II visited him in prison in Italy, on 27 December 1983 (two and a half years after the assassination attempt), Ağca recalls in his memoirs he kissed the hand of the Pope, having kissed three years earlier the hand of Khomeini in Iran, and when asked, he told John Paul II that Khomeini ordered the assassination. The claim was subsequently dismissed by the Vatican as a lie.

Ağca's shooting of the Pope and possible KGB involvement is featured in Tom Clancy's 2002 novel Red Rabbit and Frederick Forsyth's novel The Fourth Protocol. He has also been mentioned in the book The Third Revelation by Ralph McInerny, and was portrayed by actors Christopher Bucholz in the RAI production Attentato al papa, Sebastian Knapp in the ABC TV biopic movie Have No Fear: The Life of Pope John Paul II, Massimiliano Ubaldi in CBS's TV miniseries Pope John Paul II (both 2005) and Alkis Zanis in the 2006 Canadian TV sequel Karol: The Pope, The Man.

== See also ==
- Bojinka plot, a foiled terrorist attack that involved an assassination attempt against Pope John Paul II in 1995 during the World Youth Day celebrations in Manila
- Juan María Fernández y Krohn, a former Roman Catholic priest who tried to stab Pope John Paul II in 1982
- Rabia Kazan, who interviewed Ali Ağca when he was in prison
