= Gianluca Gauzzi Broccoletti =

Italian policeman

- Born: 3 June 1974 (age 52)
- Allegiance: Vatican City State; Holy See
- Branch: Gendarmerie Corps of Vatican City State
- Rank: Inspector General
- Education: Sapienza University of Rome

Gianluca Gauzzi Broccoletti, commonly known as Gianluca Gauzzi, (born 3 June 1974) is an Italian police commissioner who has been director of the Directorate for Security Services and Civil Protection of the Vatican City State and commander of the Gendarmerie Corps since 15 October 2019. He was previously deputy director and deputy commander.

== Biography ==
Gianluca Gauzzi Broccoletti was born in Gubbio, Perugia, on 3 June 1974. He graduated from Sapienza University of Rome with a safety engineering and protection degree. He and his wife have two children.

He joined the Gendarme Corps in 1995. In 1999, he was given responsibility for the design and development of the networking technology and security infrastructure of the Vatican City State and for cybersecurity as well. In 2010, he was transferred to the Operational Security Center. He became a manager in 2017 and a deputy director and deputy commander in 2018.

He coordinated security at Castel Gandolfo when Popes John Paul II and Benedict XVI used it as their summer residence. He helped manage technological security during the 2005 and 2013 conclaves. He has represented the Security and Civil Protection Services in its relations with the City of Rome and other police forces. He also occasionally testified as an expert witness at Vatican criminal proceedings.

On 15 October 2019, Pope Francis appointed Broccoletti to succeed Domenico Giani, who resigned after the Italian weekly magazine L'Espresso published confidential material relating to an ongoing investigation of financial crimes by several Vatican employees.
