= Corps of Gendarmerie of Vatican City =

Police and security force of Vatican City

Gendarmerie Corps of Vatican City State Corpo della Gendarmeria dello Stato della Città del Vaticano (Italian)
- Logo

- Flag
- Common name: Vatican Gendarmerie
- Motto: Fides et Virtus; Faith and courage

Agency overview
- Formed: 1816

Jurisdictional structure
- National agency: Vatican City State
- Operations jurisdiction: Vatican City State
- Area: 0.49 km^{2} (0.19 sq mi)
- Population: 836 (2012)
- Governing body: Governorate of the Vatican City State
- General nature: Gendarmerie; Civilian police

Operational structure
- Headquarters: Via del Pellegrino, Vatican City
- Sworn members: 122 (in 2022)
- Agency executive: Gianluca Gauzzi Broccoletti, Inspector General

Notables
- Anniversary: 29 September

Website
- Corpo della Gendarmeria

The Gendarmerie Corps of Vatican City State (Italian: Corpo della Gendarmeria dello Stato della Città del Vaticano; Latin: Corpus Gendarmeriae Urbis Vaticanae) is the gendarmerie, or military police and security force, of Vatican City, Holy See and its extraterritorial properties. It was founded in 1816 as the Corps of Gendarmes by Pope Pius VII.

== History ==
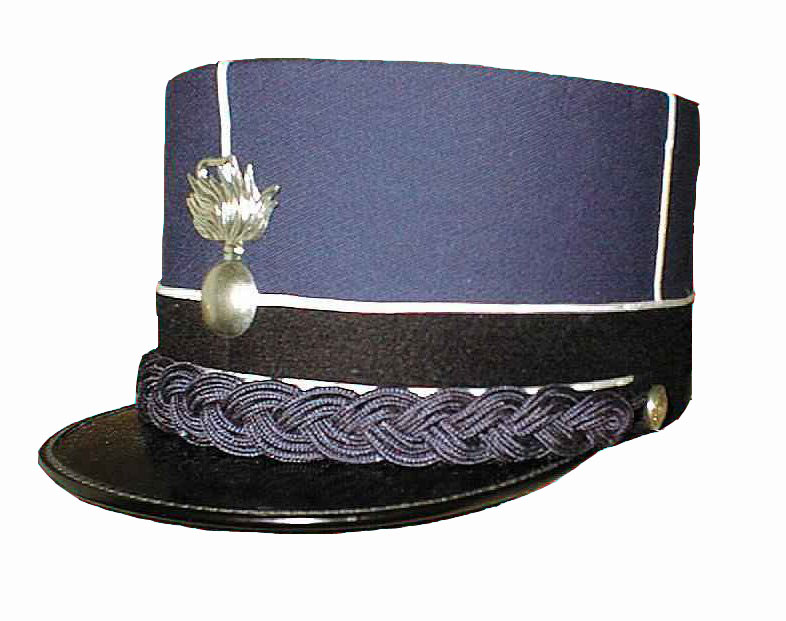
The headdress for the Gendarmerie is a Kepi cap (similar to this French example). The current Gendarmerie one has the Vatican City State badge.

In 1816, after the dissolution of the Napoleonic empire, Pope Pius VII founded the Papal Carabinieri Corps, for the service of the Papal States.

In 1849, under Pope Pius IX, it was renamed, first as the Papal Velites Regiment, and then as the Papal Gendarmerie Corps. It was charged with ensuring public security and passed from dependence on the Ministry of the Army to dependence on the Cardinal Secretary of State. It took an active part in the battles that finally led to the complete conquest of the Papal States by the victorious Kingdom of Italy.

After the capture of Rome in 1870, a small group of officers of the Corps continued to serve in the papal residence and the gardens.

In 1929, the force was expanded to deal with its duties in the newly founded Vatican City State and in the buildings and other areas over which the Holy See had extraterritorial rights.

When, in 1970, Pope Paul VI abolished all the military bodies in Papal service except the Swiss Guards, the Gendarmerie was transformed into a Central Security Office, with the duties of protecting the Pope, defending Vatican City, and providing police and security services within its territory.

Its name was changed in 1991 to Security Corps of Vatican City State and in 2002 to Gendarmerie Corps of Vatican City State.

Map of Vatican City, the barracks of the Gendarmerie is shown top-right

== Organization ==
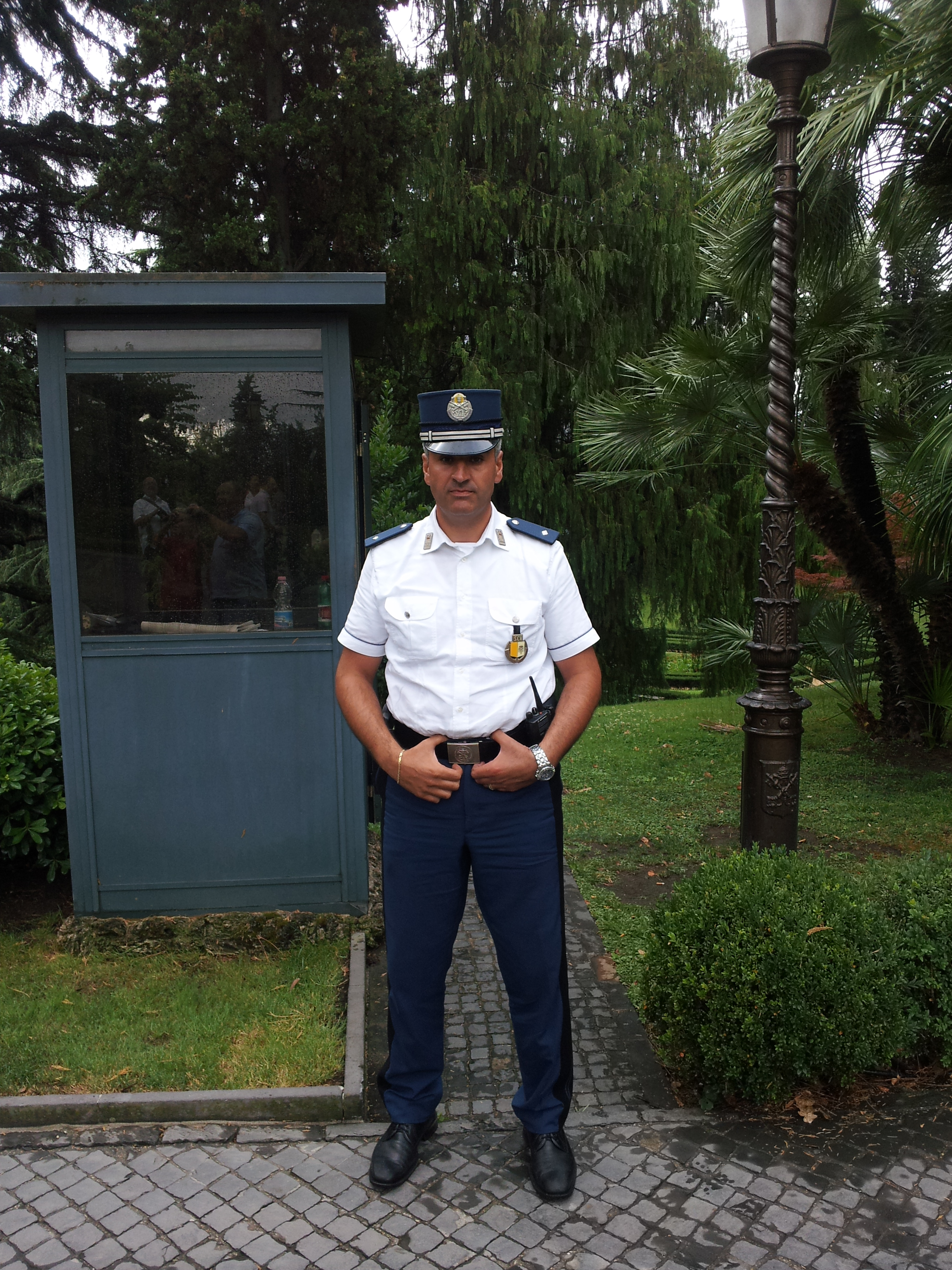
Vatican gendarme standing guard

The corps is responsible for security, public order, border control, traffic control, criminal investigation, and other general police duties in Vatican City.

The Vatican Gendarmerie includes two special units, the Rapid Intervention Group (Gruppo Intervento Rapido; G.I.R.) and an Anti-Sabotage Unit (Unità Antisabotaggio). Since 2000 an operations and control room, staffed 24 hours a day, coordinates the response of the Vatican security services in the case of an emergency.

The Interpol National Central Bureau for Vatican City, tasked with collecting and sharing relevant information on crime and security with Interpol, an organisation of which Vatican City is a full member since 2008, is also part of the Vatican Gendarmerie.

While the protection of the Pope's person is primarily the Swiss Guard's responsibility, the gendarmes ensure public order at the audiences, meetings and ceremonies at which he is present. In Italian territory and other countries, this is done in liaison with the local police authorities.

In 2015, the Gendarmerie made eight arrests.

The corps numbered 130 in 2017. It is led by Inspector General Gianluca Gauzzi Broccoletti, who has served on the Vatican gendarmerie since 1995 and who was made deputy leader in 2018. He was appointed by Pope Francis on 15 October 2019.

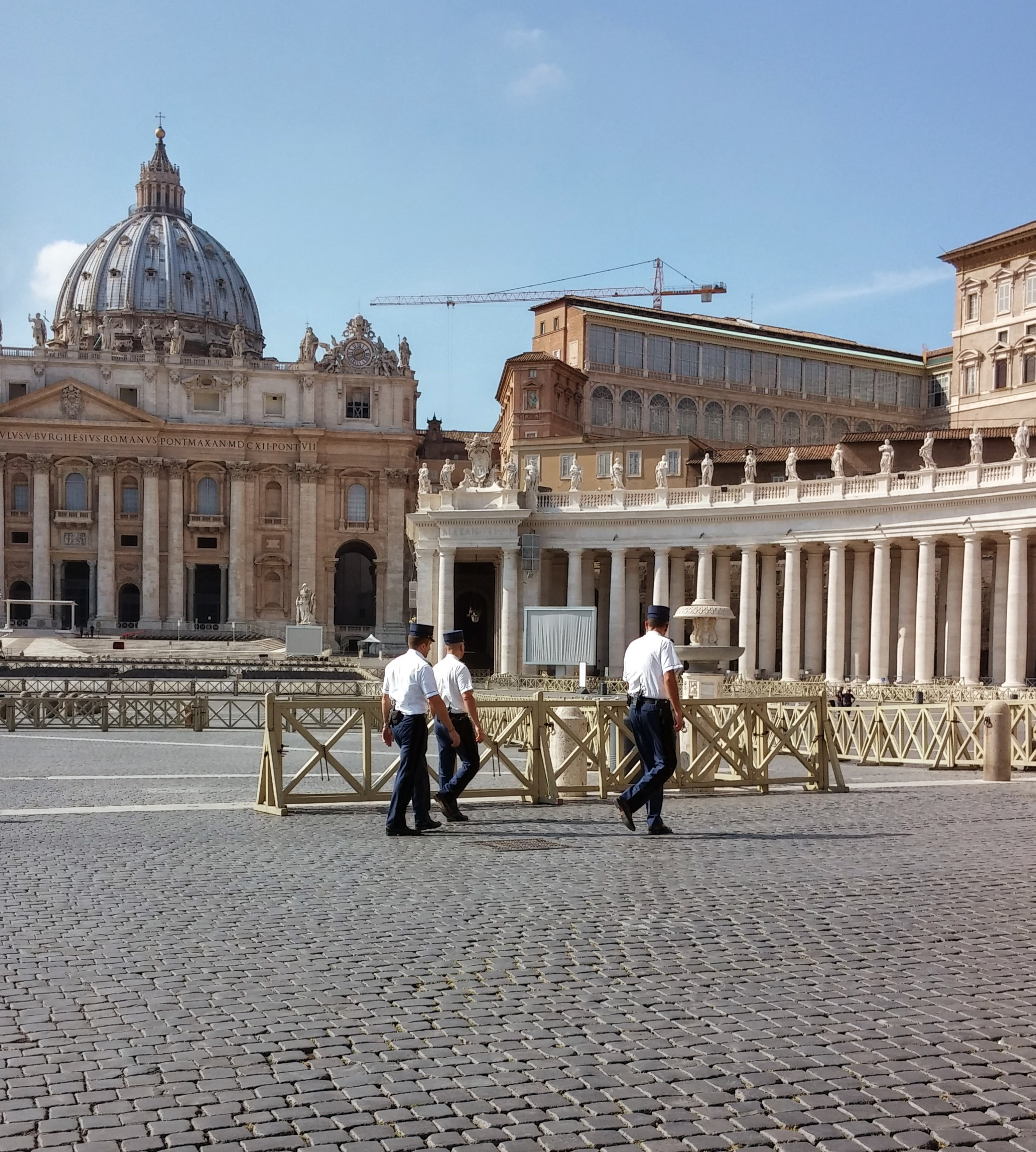
Vatican police officers in Saint Peter's Square in short-sleeved everyday uniform (2014)

=== Numbers ===
There are a number of different roles within the Gendarmerie. Ranks are shown in the structure below. Some members of the Gendarmerie are officers; some are gendarmes.

- 99 officers
- three department heads
- eight police chiefs
- 16 police commissioners
- 32 inspectors
- 40 vice-inspectors
- 94 gendarmes

=== Band ===
The Band of the Gendarmerie (Italian: Banda musicale del Corpo della Gendarmeria) is a uniformed band of musicians that serves at Gendarmerie events and also serves as the official marching band of Vatican City.

In October 2007, the band was the heir to the Papal Gendarmerie band founded in 1851 and, in turn, descended from the musical formations of the body of the Pontifical Velites. The band is made up of about 100 musicians and volunteers coming from the Italian military bands such as the Italian Army Music Band and the National Carabinieri Band.

=== Rapid Intervention Group (GIR) ===
The Gendarmerie has a Rapid Intervention Group (Gruppo di Intervento Rapido; GIR, Celeris Interventio Cohors; CIC), a police tactical unit trained for various situations to respond to threats more effectively:

- shooting procedures
- combat in a restricted environment
- anti-sabotage
- breaching

== Operations ==
The Gendarmerie are responsible for policing the whole of Vatican City State (however, the Italian Polizia di Stato and sometimes Italian Carabinieri patrol St. Peter's Square) and one of the two that provide security for the Pope within the Vatican along with Swiss Guards, as well as during the Pope's international travels accompanied by the country's local protection agencies and law enforcement.

20 of the 138 Vatican officers have received special training for anti-terrorist actions. Some of these officers accompany the Pope during his international travels for security.

The Vatican has an operational centre "of high technological level", and thousands of surveillance cameras, as well as in extraterritorial Vatican properties.

=== Training ===
To qualify for enrollment as a gendarme, a person must be an unmarried male, between the ages of 21 and 24, of good health and a practising Catholic. There are also minimum requirements of height and education—standing at least 5 ft 8 in (1.73 m), and being a high school graduate.

Military service is not a requirement, but it is advantageous (in Italy, there are two national military police forces in addition to civilian police forces).

The Gendarmerie's patron saint is Saint Michael the Archangel. Since 1977, the oratory of San Pellegrino in Vaticano serves as the chapel of the Gendarmerie. The church previously served as the chapel of the Pontifical Swiss Guard.

=== Relationship with Italy ===
As Vatican City State is a country within another country, and due to the nature of the policing duties of the Gendarmerie, the Vatican Government and Gendarmerie maintain strong links with the Italian police and authorities.

Sometimes, they will visibly assist each other in times of crisis, such as the August 2016 Central Italy earthquake, when the Pope reportedly sent some gendarmes to assist in the rescue, but also to keep law and order. The gendarmes sent were in uniform and carrying firearms, as it was reported that there were looters in the area. Members of the Vatican Fire Brigade and Pontifical Swiss Guard were also sent to help.

Likewise, the Italian Arma dei Carabinieri (Italian state military police) and Polizia di Stato (Italian national civil state police) are seen in and around St. Peter's Square (Vatican territory), policing the crowds and carrying out protective duties.

== Equipment and vehicles ==
=== Weaponry ===
The Gendarmerie is equipped with weapons to protect Vatican City and the Pope.

Model	Origin	Type	Notes
Glock 17	Austria	Semi-automatic pistol	Standard issue
Beretta M12	Italy	Submachine gun	Standard issue
Heckler & Koch MP5	Germany	Submachine gun	Standard issue
Carbon 15	United States	Assault rifle	Used by the Rapid Intervention Group (GIR)
Heckler & Koch FABARM FP6	Germany	Shotgun	Used by the Rapid Intervention Group (GIR)

=== Vehicles ===
In 2010, Ducati presented two police motorbikes to the Gendarmeria, designed in the white and yellow colours of the Vatican.

In September 2012, the Gendarmerie was equipped with one Kangoo Maxi ZE electric car.

Later, in 2012, the donations of a Fiat Bravo and a Renault Kangoo led to the debut of a blue livery with a white-gold band, initially with the words "Gendarmeria Vaticana" then simply changed to "Gendarmeria".

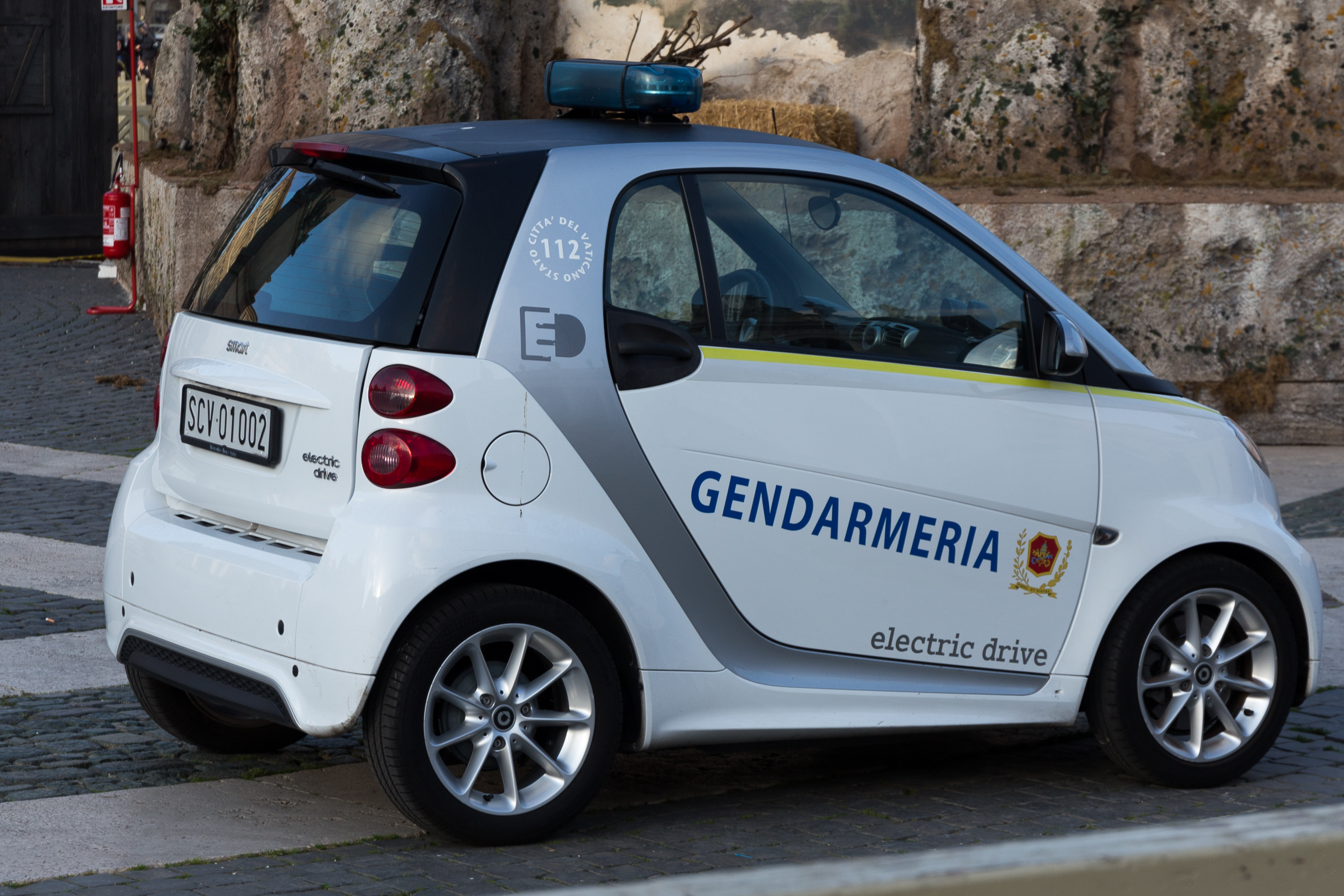
Smart electric drive

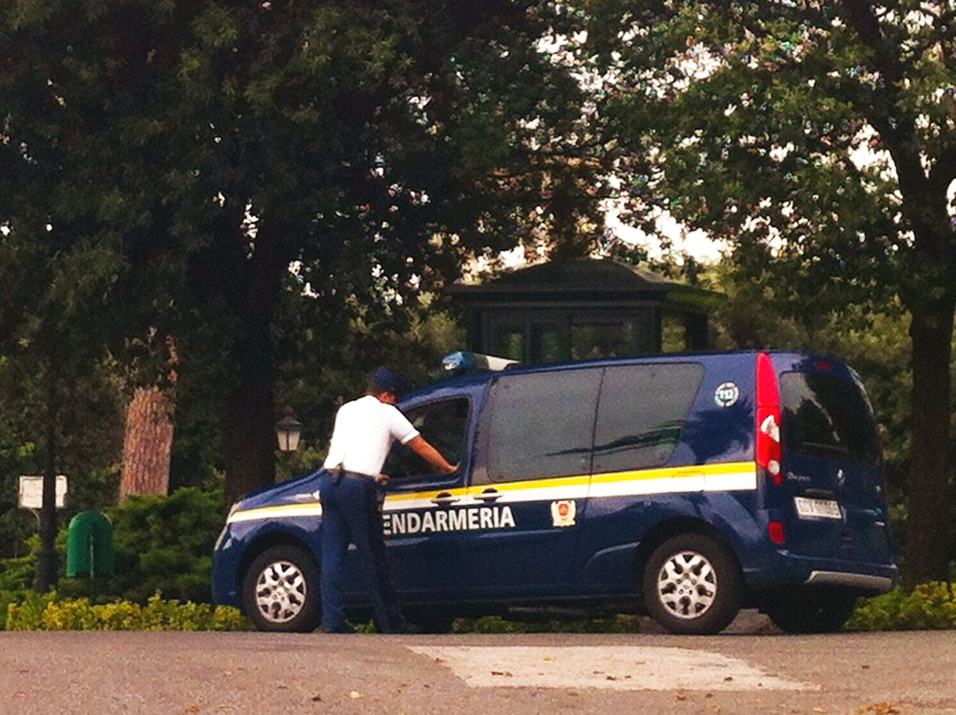
A Gendarmerie car in the Vatican Gardens

- Ducati motorbikes (marked) (2) (SCV064 and SCV065)
- Harley-Davidson Road King motorbikes (marked) (2) (SCV0176 and SCV0177)
- Four-person buggy
- Volkswagen E-up! electric cars (marked) (2)
- Fiat Bravo (marked) (1)
- Smart ForTwo (marked) (2)
- Renault Kangoo Maxi ZE electric car (marked) (1)
- VW Passat cars for escort work (unmarked) (2)
- Fiat Ducato van (control/communications unit) (1)
- Iveco Daily Anti-sabotage unit van and trailer (1)
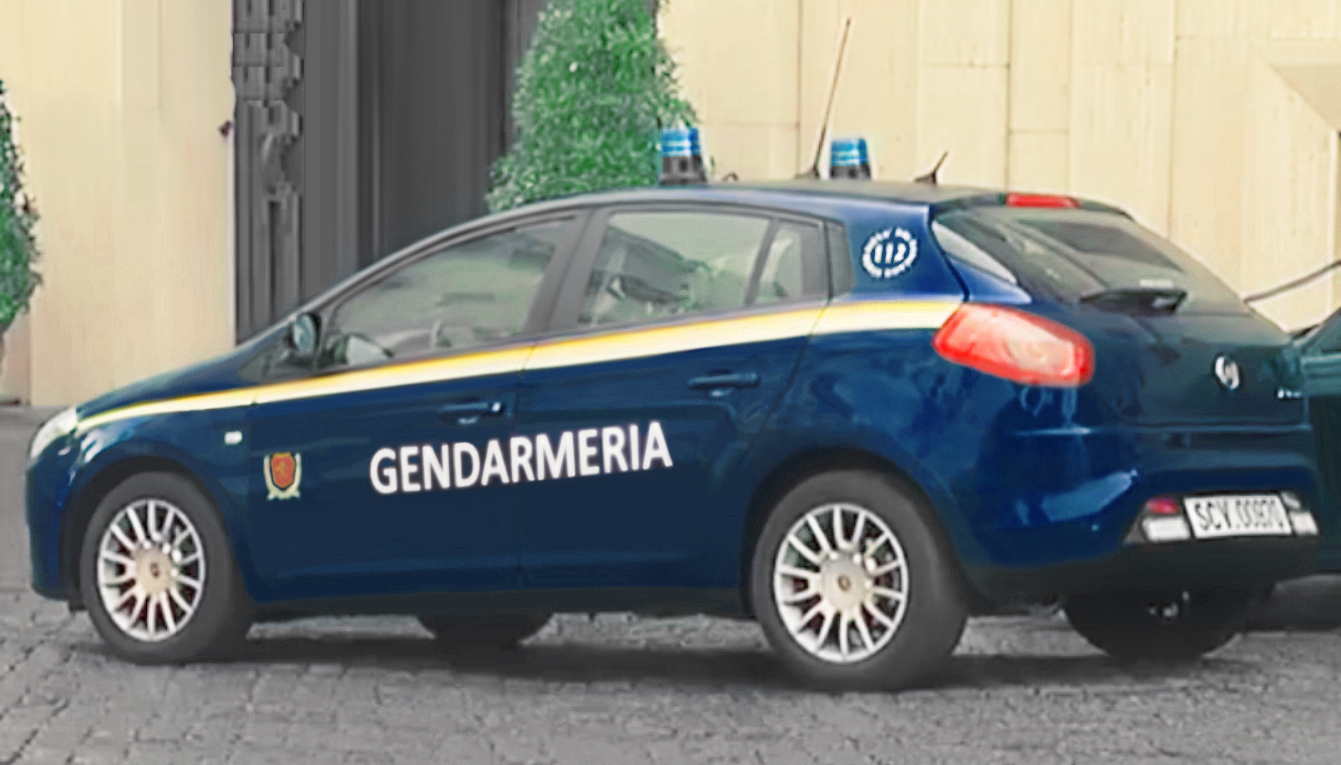
  Fiat Bravo Gendarmerie vehicle
- Mercedes-Benz G-class open-top pickup (GIR) (1)

All of these vehicles are registered in Vatican City State with 'SCV' preceding the numbers on all vehicle registration plates (the Pope's vehicles wear 'SCV1').

The vehicles are equipped with blue emergency vehicle lighting.

=== Other equipment ===
Radios are carried and used with earpieces and microphones on duty.

Against possible riots, they are supplied with batons, tasers, pepper sprays and tear gas.

Swords are carried for ceremonial duties.

== Uniforms ==
Before 1970, the 180 Pontifical Gendarmes wore elaborate ceremonial uniforms of 19th-century origin. These included bearskin headdresses with red plumes, black coatees with white-fringed epaulettes, white doeskin breeches and knee-high riding boots. In service dress bicornes and blue trousers were substituted.

The present-day Vatican City gendarmes wear dark blue modern police uniforms. There are different orders of dress for different occasions and seasons (as well as weather). However, rank, insignia and decorations do not differ between uniforms.

Everyday dress

- Blue kepi (cap) with cap badge
- White shirt
- Black tie
- Blue tunic with four pockets, or long black jacket or short black bomber jacket
- Pocket badge
- Blue trousers with a black stripe down the side
- Black boots.

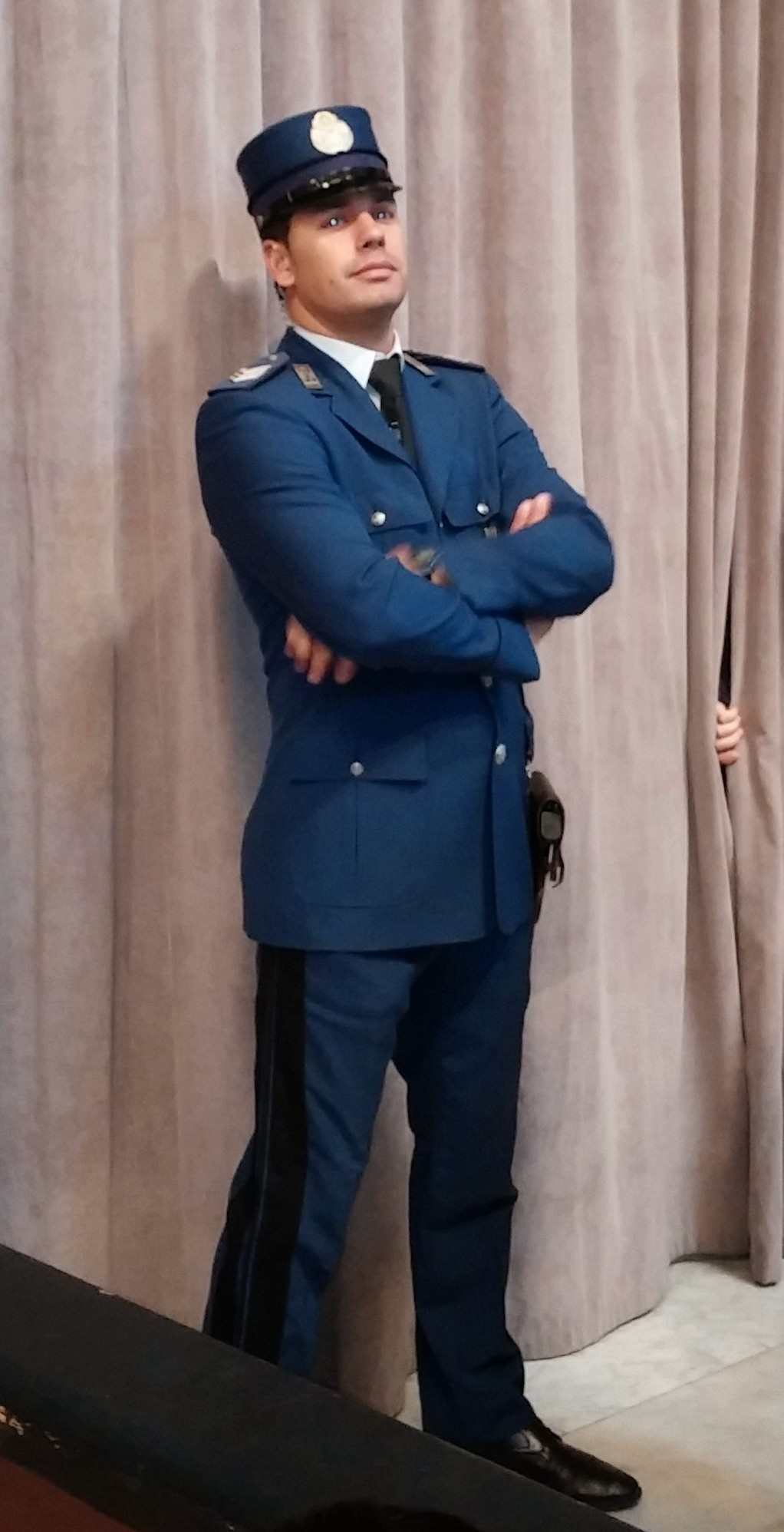
Gendarme showing the everyday uniform (tunic configuration). Notice the Italian-style pistol holster, worn on the left for cross-draw purposes

Dress-down uniform

- (worn when the above is impractical/unsuitable)
- Light blue polo shirt
- Dark blue trousers
- V-neck jumper
- Jacket
- Baseball cap
- Black boots/shoes

Special/practical duties

- Dark blue shirt-jacket
- Dark blue cargo trousers
- Helmet
- Square baseball cap
- Beret
- Black boots

Plain clothes

- A dark suit may be worn when gendarmes carry out close protection duties (e.g. assisting the Swiss Guard with protecting the Pope)

Ceremonial dress

- Blue kepi (cap) with cap badge
- White shirt
- Black tie
- Blue tunic with four pockets
- Pocket badge
- Blue trousers with a black stripe down the side
- Dark blue cape with clasp (wintertime)
- Black waist belts with belt badge over tunic (with or without closed pistol holster or sword)
- Officers wear a gold and yellow shoulder sash
- White gloves
- Medals are worn on the left breast (if any)
- Black boots

== Ranks ==
The ranks of the Corps of Gendarmerie was adopted in 2002 with the renaming of the Security Corps.

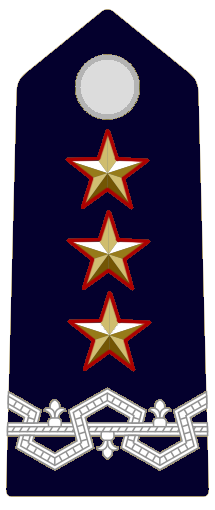
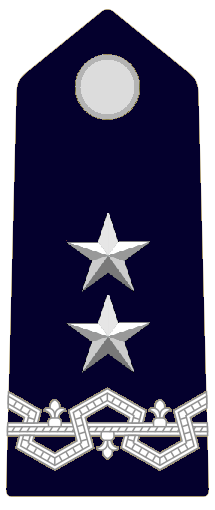
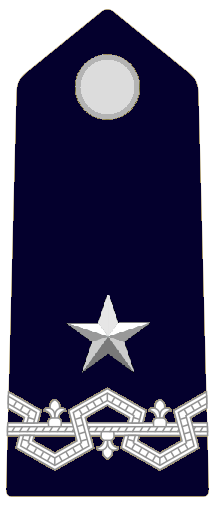
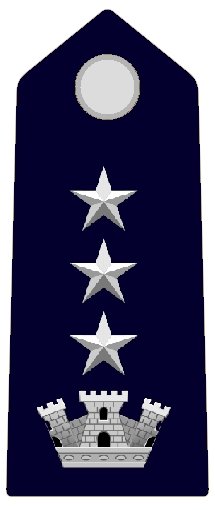
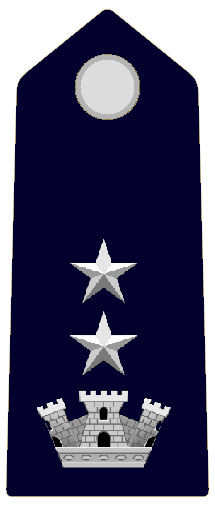
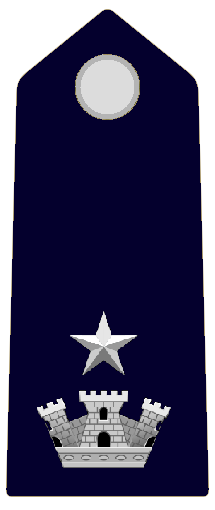
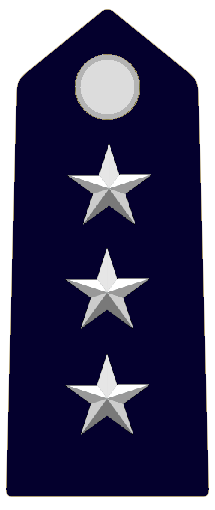
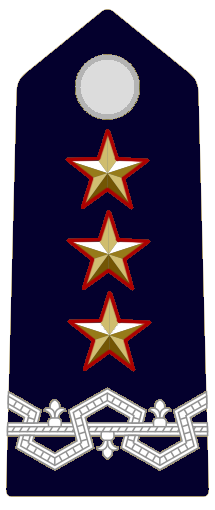
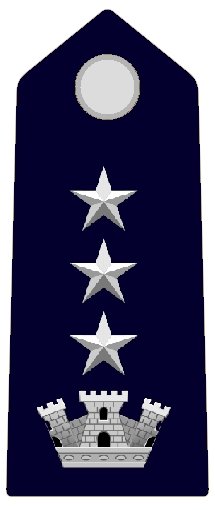
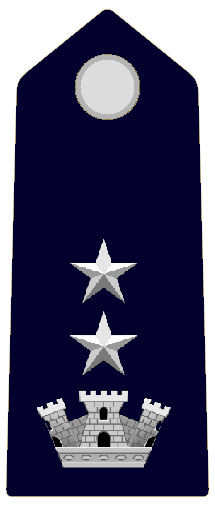
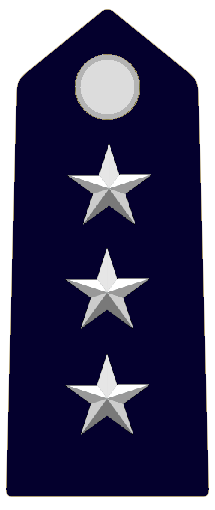
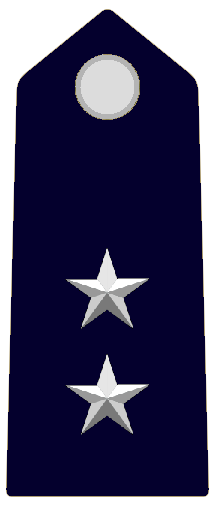
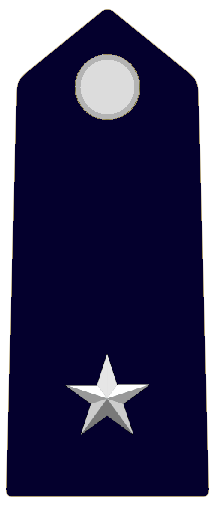
Rank group	General / flag officers			Senior officers			Junior officers
Gendarmerie of Vatican City
Gendarmerie of Vatican City	Ispettore generale	Dirigente generale	Dirigente superiore	Primo dirigente	Dirigente	Commissario	Vice commissario
Security Corps of Vatican City (1970-2002)
Security Corps of Vatican City (1970-2002)	Ispettore generale			Vice ispettore vicario	Vice ispettore		Sovrastante maggiore	Sovrastante	Vice sovrastante

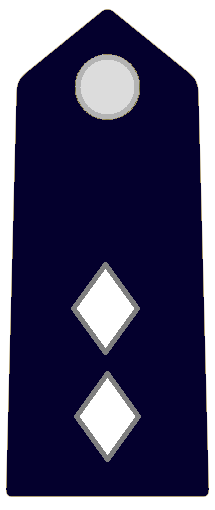
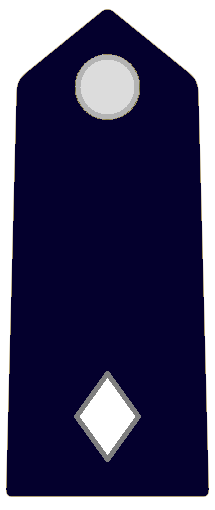
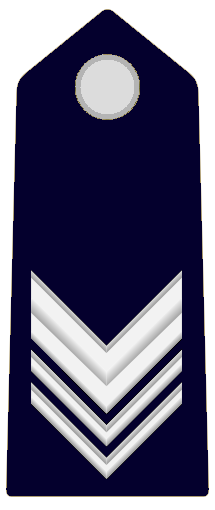
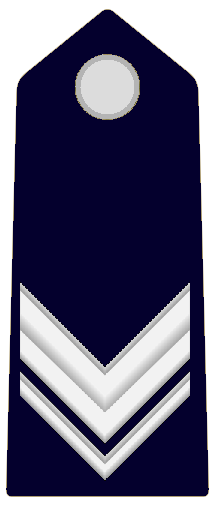
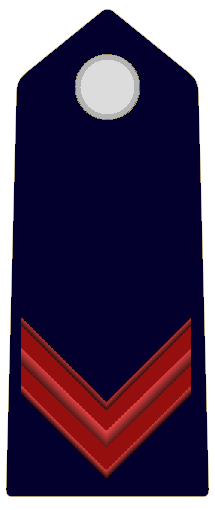
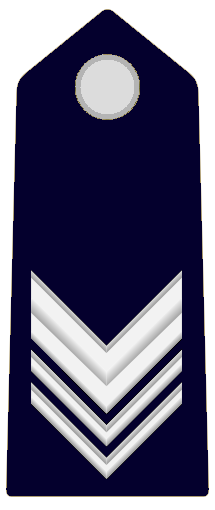
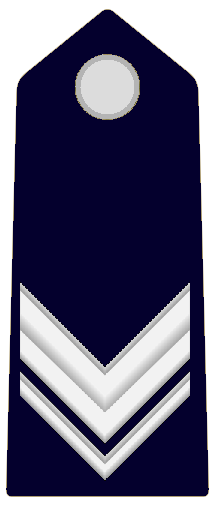
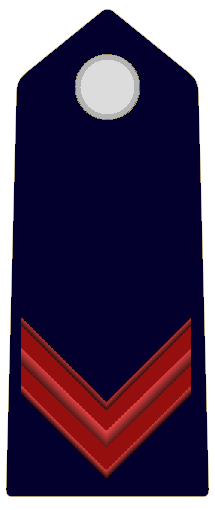
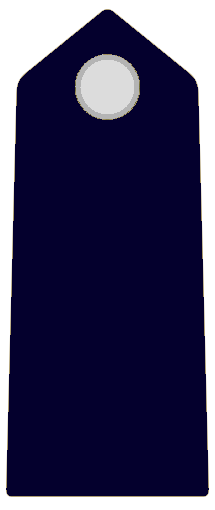
Rank group	Senior NCOs		Junior NCOs		Enlisted
Gendarmerie of Vatican City
Gendarmerie of Vatican City	Ispettore	Vice ispettore	Brigadiere	Vice brigadiere	Gendarme
Security Corps of Vatican City (1970-2002)
Security Corps of Vatican City (1970-2002)			Assistente	Vice assistente	Agente scelto	Agente

== Commanders ==
- Arcangelo De Mandato (1922-1942)
- Adolfo Soleti (1942-1944)
- Mario Pericoli (1944-1958)
- Francesco Saverio Bernado (1959-1961)
- Spartaco Angelini (1961-1971)
- Camillo Cibin (1 August 1972 – 2 June 2006 )
- Domenico Giani (3 June 2006 – 14 October 2019 )
- Gianluca Gauzzi Broccoletti (15 October 2019 – present)

== Other security services in the Vatican ==
The Commandant of the Gendarmerie Corps is the head of the Directorate of Security and Civil Protection Services, which also oversees the Vatican fire brigade.

Security in Vatican City is also provided by the Pontifical Swiss Guard, a military unit of the Holy See, not Vatican City State. The Swiss Guard are responsible for the security of the Pope, dignitaries and all papal buildings. The Swiss Guard have maintained a centuries-long tradition of carrying swords and halberds, unlike the Gendarmerie Corps.

== See also ==
- Crime in Vatican City
- Index of Vatican City-related articles
- Swiss Guards
- Papal Army
- Military of Vatican City
- Noble Guard (Vatican)
- Palatine Guard
- Pontifical Swiss Guard
- Papal Zouaves
- Corsican Guard
- Corps of Firefighters of the Vatican City State
