= Walter Di Salvo =

Italian architect

- Born: 20 July 1926; Florence, Kingdom of Italy
- Died: 22 February 2017 (aged 90); Massa Marittima, Tuscany, Italy
- Education: University of Florence
- Occupations: Architect; Urban planner

Walter Di Salvo (20 July 1926 – 22 February 2017) was an Italian architect responsible for planning the layout of Punta Ala (Grosseto, Italy).

He also designed many important buildings in Punta Ala including the La Vela bar (1960), the church of Consolata (1961), Villa Rusconi and Villa Marzocchi (1962), Villa Nanni (1963), villa Di Gravio and the restaurant bar La Bussola (1965). In 1976 he built his own house Villa Di Salvo. He created more than 180 projects.

In 1987, he took part at the Fiat's Novoli Project in Florence, together with other architects such as Giovanni Michelucci, Richard Rogers, Bruno Zevi, Leonardo Ricci and Rob Krier. He also designed the shopping gallery of the Firenze Santa Maria Novella railway station.

== Awards ==
He was awarded the IN-ARCH Prize for Tuscany, in 1990.

== Sources ==
- Barbara Catalani; Marco Del Francia; Giovanni Tombari (2011). Itinerari di architettura contemporanea. Grosseto e provincia. Pisa: ETS.
- Marco Del Francia (2008). "Walter Di Salvo. Poetiche wrightiane in Maremma". Architetture Grosseto (4–5). Pisa: ETS: 39–40.
- Marco Del Francia (2017). "Walter Di Salvo (1926-2017). Il vissuto umano e professionale di Walter Di Salvo". Architetture Grosseto (22). Pisa: ETS: 42–49.
- Stefano Giommoni (2017). "Walter Di Salvo ed il piano di Punta Ala. Il connubio disciplinare tra l'architettura e l'urbanistica". Architetture Grosseto (22). Pisa: ETS: 50–55.
