= Leonardo Ricci =

Leonardo Ricci may refer to:

- Leonardo Ricci (architect), Italian architect
- Leonardo Ricci (geographer), Italian geographer and cartographer
