= Savona Courthouse =

Judiciary building in Savona, Italy

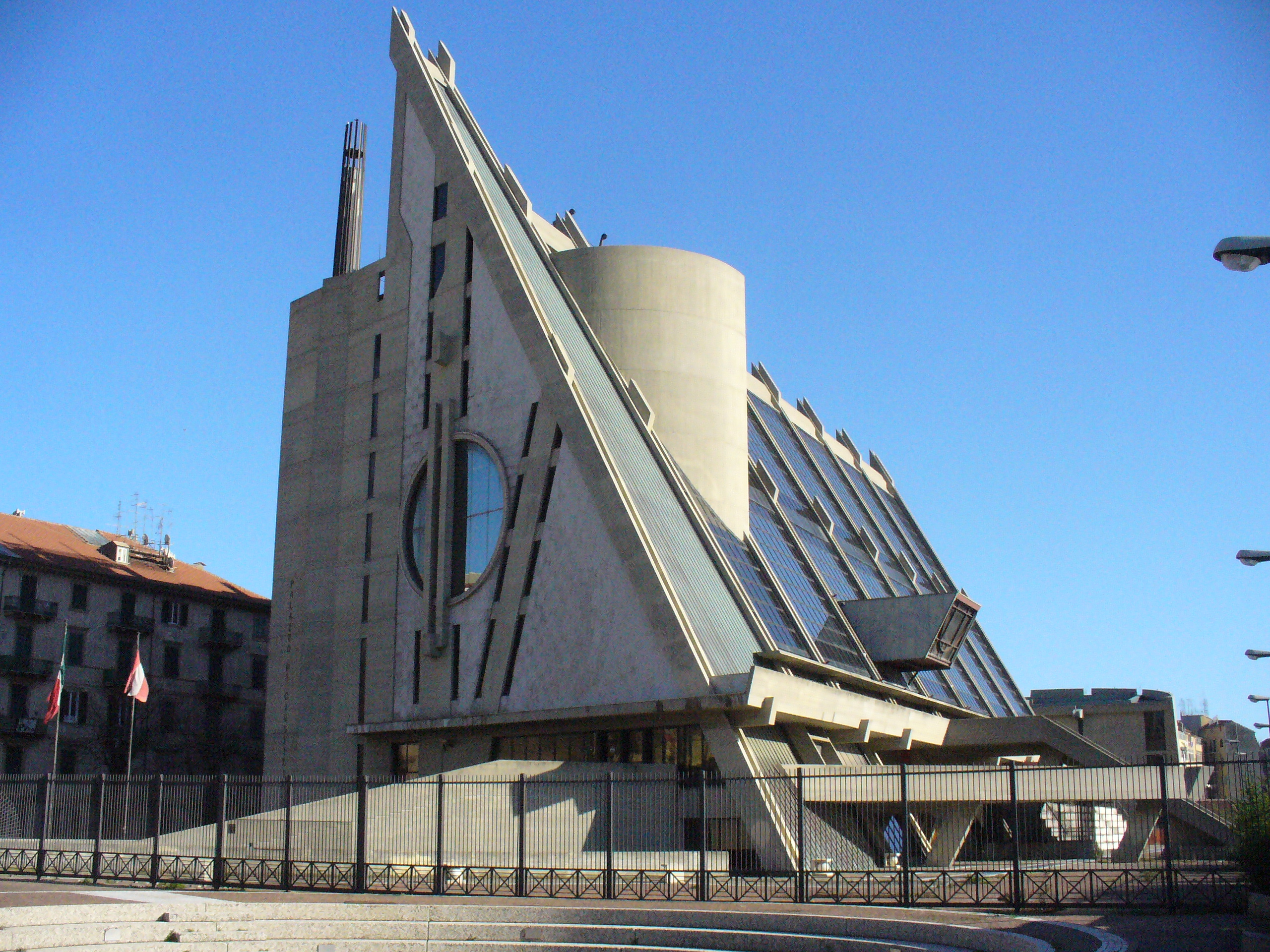
- Interactive map of the Savona Courthouse area

General information
- Location: Savona, Liguria, Italy
- Coordinates: 44°18′22.9″N 8°28′38.9″E
- Construction started: 1981
- Completed: August 1987
- Opening: 1992

Design and construction
- Architects: Leonardo Ricci, Maria Grazia Dall'Erba

The Savona Courthouse (Italian: Palazzo di Giustizia di Savona, lit. 'Palace of Justice of Savona') is a judicial complex located on Via XX Settembre in Savona, Italy.

The building, designed by architect Leonardo Ricci, is considered one of the most significant examples of modern architecture in Liguria. It is appreciated for its bold and innovative volumes that stand out in the surrounding context, characterized by oblique lines, sharp edges, and large glass panels.

It won the IN/Arch Award from the National Institute of Architecture in 1989.

== History ==
The new courthouse in Savona was designed by architect Leonardo Ricci following a national competition organized by the Ministry of Justice in the 1950s. However, the timeline was significantly extended, and the construction was only carried out in the 1980s. During the design process, Ricci was assisted by architect Maria Grazia Dell'Erba. The courthouse was inaugurated in 1992.

== Description ==
The exposed reinforced concrete volumes intersect and overlap, giving the building a massive and monolithic appearance. The large glass windows, on the other hand, create a play of light and shadow that constantly changes, imparting a sense of dynamism to the building. The structure is oriented to maximize natural lighting and features facades that are differently articulated according to the setting: an open front with glass facing the greenery and a more sculptural and symbolic side facing the city.

The internal spaces revolve around the so-called "basilica", an open area that connects all functions and faces all offices and rooms. The main auditorium is separated from the main structure and is shaped as a semicircular body connected by covered walkways.

== Sources ==
- Giovanna Franco; Stefano Francesco Musso (2016). Architetture in Liguria dopo il 1945. Genoa: De Ferrari. p. 322.
- Vittorio Pizzigoni (2021). "Too Good to Be True: the Savona Courthouse". Histories of Postwar Architecture (9).
- Sergio Polano; Marco Mulazzani, eds. (1991). Guida all'architettura italiana del Novecento. Milano: Electa. pp. 304–305.
- Leonardo Ricci (1987). Il Palazzo di Giustizia di Savona. Florence: Centri Di.
- Bruno Zevi (1996). "Palazzo di Giustizia, Savona, Italia". Zodiac (16): 156–159.
- Bruno Zevi (1997). Storia e controstoria dell'architettura italiana. Rome: Newton & Compton.

== See also ==
- Florence Courthouse
