= Tullio Vinay =

Italian politician

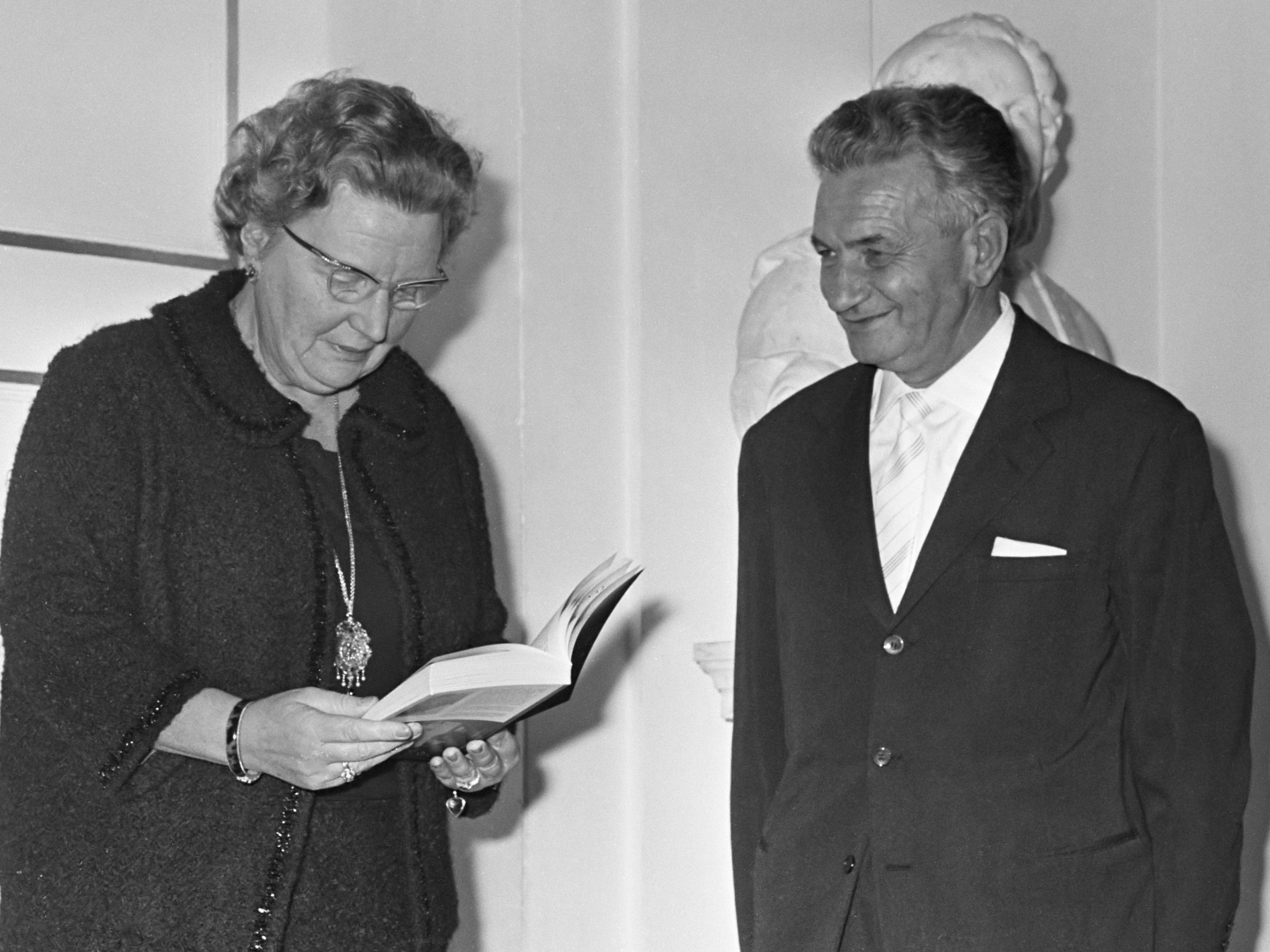
Tullio Vinay with Queen Juliana in 1967

Tullio Vinay was a Waldensian pastor and theologian, as well as an Italian politician, who was born in La Spezia on May 13, 1909 and died in Rome on September 2, 1996. Recognized as a Righteous Among the Nations and founder of two important church institutions, he is one of the leading figures of Italian Protestantism in the 20th century.

== Biography ==
=== Youth and training ===
Tullio Vinay is the son of a teacher, pastor and theologian of the Waldensian Evangelical Church. He grew up in Trieste and Torre Pellice and studied Protestant theology in Rome at the Waldensian Faculty of Theology and then at the University of Edinburgh.

=== Start of Career and Second World War ===
From his consecration in 1934 until 1946, he was pastor of the Evangelical Waldensian Church of Florence. During this period, he launched into multiple anti-fascist activities and managed to save dozens of Jews who hid in a secret apartment within the headquarters of the Waldensian church Via Manzoni. In 1982, he was recognized Righteous Among the Nations by the Israeli government, which did not prevent him from being sharply critical of the State of Israel's policies towards Palestinians.

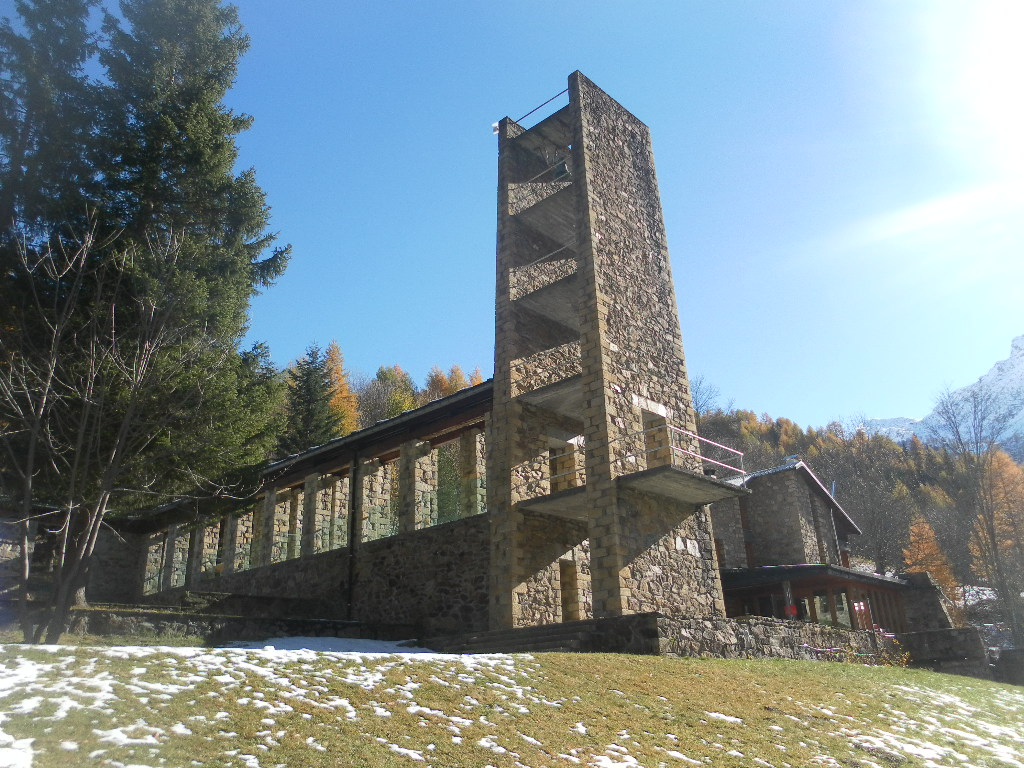
View of the Agapè center (in the foreground, the bell tower).

=== Foundation of the International Agapè Center ===
In 1946, Tullio Vinay left his pastoral position in Florence, and the following year he founded the Ecumenical Church Center at Prali, in Piedmont. Indeed, after the World War II, the Waldensian Church wanted to contribute actively to the necessary work of reconciliation. In 1947, under the leadership of Pastor Tullio Vinay, some young Italian Protestants began the construction project of the Agapè Center. With the support of the World Council of Churches, they were soon joined by young people from different countries who, just a few years before, were fighting each other in a merciless war: Americans, English, Germans, French, etc. Agapè was a place of meeting, living and working together for young people from different countries but also different religions, including non-believers, in a confrontation where everyone would have to give up their claim of owning the truth, a concept well ahead of its time in 1947. The purpose of this center was thus summarized by its founder: "Agape is a place where people meet and spend a brief period of living together in search of brotherly love. To the question of when the idea of founding this center was born, Tullio Vinay replied: "When we discovered, with astonishment and surprise, that God loves us". The architect of the building was Leonardo Ricci, a renowned architect and also a friend of Tullio Vinay.

=== Settlement in Sicily ===
In 1961, Pastor Vinay gave life to a new great project, this time in the heart of Sicily, in the city of Riesi, where he founded the "Christian service center" to respond to the economic, social and moral misery of the local population and to create an outpost against the Mafia's excessive power. Without practicing any form of proselytism, the Riesi Christian Service immediately identified its areas of intervention, education, health and sustainable development of the territory, in accordance with the Protestant and Waldensian vision which believes that each person must be accompanied towards their liberation of any form of slavery, including when it is a cultural one. Today, the Christian service of Riesi consists of a kindergarten, an elementary school, an accommodation centre, a social and health center (initially a family counseling center) and an agricultural advisory center. Originally, there was also a vocational school.

As for Agape, the buildings housing the Christian Service Center were designed and built between 1963 and 1966 by architect Leonardo Ricci; named Monte degli Ulivi (Mount of Olives), the buildings are considered a remarkable example of the 20th century Italian architecture. Since 2009, the ensemble is recognized as being of cultural interest by the region of Sicily.

=== Political commitment ===
From 1976 to 1983, Tullio Vinay was a member of the Senate of the Italian Republic, elected as independent on the Italian Communist Party's list.

== Awards ==
- 1982: Righteous among the nations
- 1987: Leopold-Lucas Prize of the University of Tübingen
- 1981: Doctor honoris causa of the Montpellier Faculty of Protestant Theology

== Posterity ==
Pastor Tullio Vinay is the outstanding figure of Italian Protestantism in the 20th century. He has considerably renewed its Christian proclamation and testimony of charity through the founding of the two institutions of Agape and Riesi.

In 1974 Tullio Vinay was the inspiration of the two founders of the Mouvement des Chrétiens pour l'Abolition de la Torture (Christian Action for the Abolition of Torture movement, a.k.a. ACAT), which was launched in the UK as Action by Christians against Torture in 1984.

== Sources ==
- translated for the French Wikipedia page on 7 August 2018.
