= Pasquino Corso =

Italian Condottiero

Pasquino Corso, also known as Pasquino da Perugia or Pasquino di Sia (died 15 July 1532) was a Corsican Condottiero (mercenary warlord) active during the Italian Wars which took place during the first half of the 16th century.

== Life ==
Pasquino Corso was native to Ota, a Corsican village belonging to the pieve of Sia, and not to Perugia, as it is written in some contemporary sources. Apart from the dispute about his birthplace, nothing is known about his life until 1514. In August of that year he participated, on the orders of Renzo da Ceri, a condottiero fighting for Venice, in the battle of Ombriano near Crema, which took place for the possession of this besieged Lombard city, between the Spaniards and Sforzas on the one side and the Venetians and Frenchmen, eventually winners, on the other side. Afterwards, until 1526 he served under the Black Bands, organized by the condottiero Giovanni dalle Bande Nere.

In June of 1526 Corso moved to Siena which he tried to conquer by entering through the Porta Camollia with 800-1,000 men, but he was chased away by the armies of the republic.

=== At the siege of Florence ===
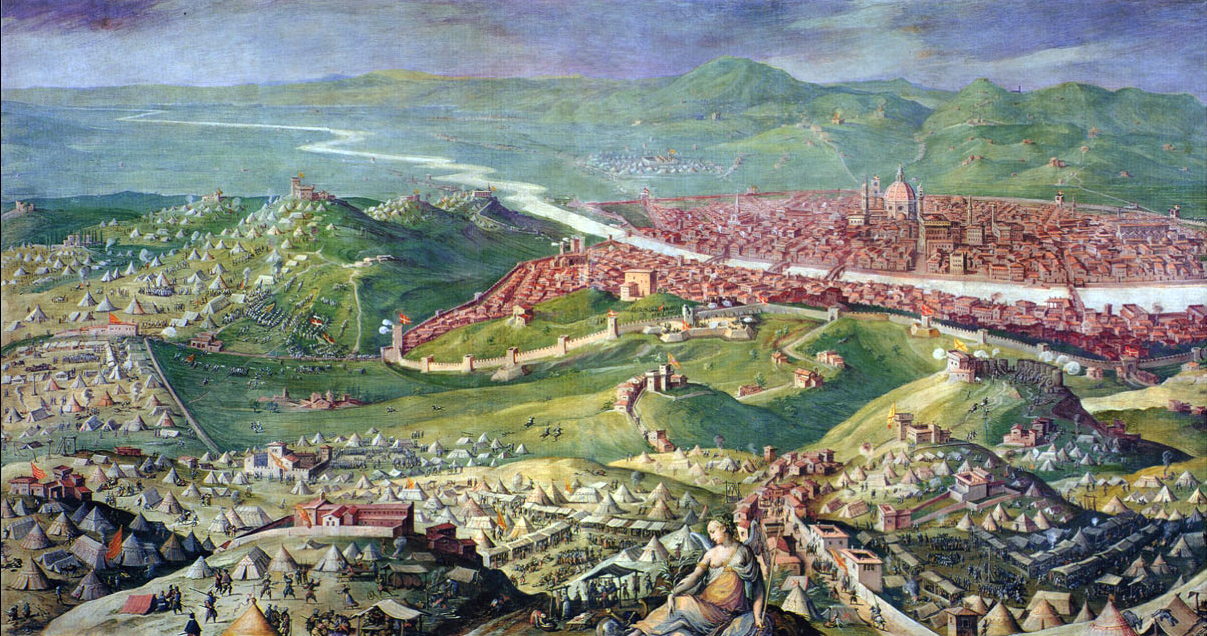
The siege of Florence by Giorgio Vasari

In 1529 he was hired together with other condottieri by Zanobi Bartolini Salimbeni, one of the ten magistrates (Italian: Consiglio dei Dieci) ruling the Republic of Florence, to defend the state from the imperial menace. In that year in Florence, which was preparing itself for the siege by the Imperial-Spanish troops led by Charles V, he commanded 2,000 Corsicans mercenaries, but instead of obeying the city government he followed orders from Malatesta Baglioni, signore of Perugia who was allied to, and later betrayed, the republic. In August of that year he was moved to Cortona but protested about the delay in being paid. In September he was transferred to Ossaia near Cortona together with another condottiero, Amico da Venafro, but shortly thereafter the two condottieri had to leave that place because of an epidemic of plague that struck some soldiers under their command.

In October 1529, after the beginning of the siege, Pasquino returned to Florence to defend the besieged republic: on that occasion he was in charge of defending Porta San Giorgio. In November he was at Empoli, defended by Francesco Ferruccio, the possession of which was vital for securing supplies to the city. He left that town half a month later to return to Florence. In December, along with Amico d'Arsoli he had the task to defend Lastra a Signa during the siege. Then he came back to the city and was in charge of defending Porta San Niccoló. After some unsuccessful actions, Ferruccio, in a report to the republic, compared the ranks of Pasquino to tabby cats, beautiful but incapable of catching mice, and his soldiers in Empoli to ugly but expert cats.

At the beginning of 1530, Pasquino asked to be paid in advance, threatening to abandon the defense of the city if this request was refused. In March the Corsican condottiero was imprisoned by Francesco Ferruccio in the Stinche jail, but was released shortly afterwards by the Florentines, who raised his wages to encourage his loyalty. In June Pasquino supported the commander of the florentine militia, Stefano Colonna, in a night attack to the imperial camp near the church of San Donato in Polverosa at Novoli. The attack was successful, but at the end he was unable to help Colonna, since his Corsican soldiers scattered to sack the camp, and after returning to Florence he was forced to justify himself.

Soon after the surrender of Florence to Charles V in August 1630, Pasquino brought chaos in the city with his soldiers. He was able to imprison Malatesta Baglioni, releasing him only after that the Florentines had agreed to pay 10,000 scudi to avoid the city being sacked.

=== Colonel of the Corsican Guard and death ===
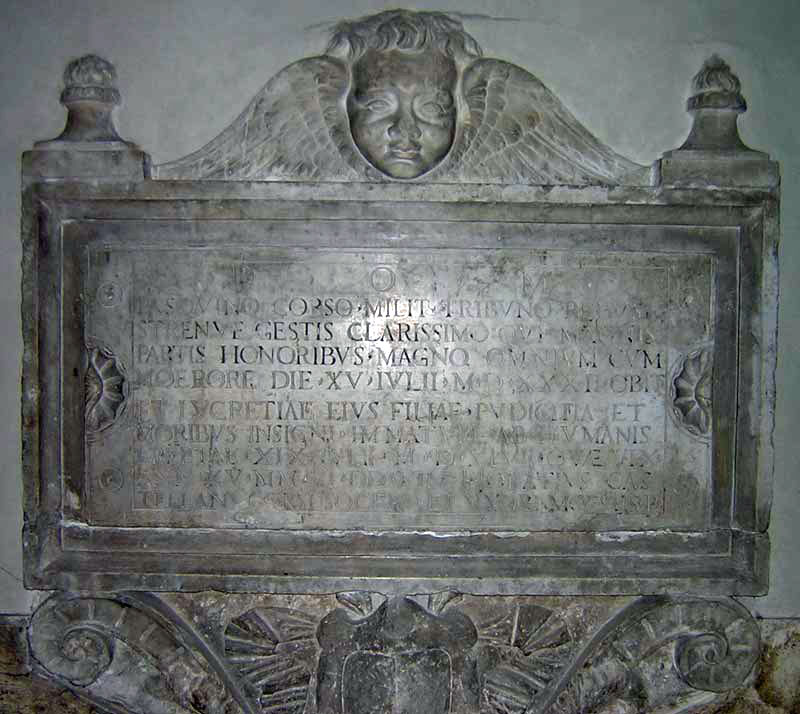
Funerary monument of Pasquino Corso and his daughter Lucrezia in San Crisogono, Rome

In 1531 he moved to Rome at the service of Pope Clement VII Medici and was appointed colonel (Latin: Miles tribunus) of the corsican militia, which at that time (and until its formal disbanding in 1662) constituted the backbone of the pope's army.

Pasquino Corso died in Rome on 15 July 1532 and was buried in San Crisogono, the national church of the Corsican nation placed in Trastevere, the rione where most of the Corsican immigrants had settled in the 16th century.

On the wall of the right nave, near the second column, is a memorial plaque, erected 15 years after his death on the occasion of the death of his daughter Lucrezia, with the following Latin inscription:

Pasquino Corso Milit. Tribuno rebus - strenue gestis clarissimo qui magnis - partis honoribus magno omnium cum - moerore die XV Julii M. D. XXXII obit (sic) - et Lucretiae eius filiae pudicitia et - moribus insigni immaturae ab humanis - ereptae XIX Julii M. D XLVII quae vixit - ann. XV mm. VI dd. XII - Horatius - Castellani corsi socero et uxori moestis.

== See also ==
- Siege of Florence (1529–30)
- Corsican Guard
