= Military in Vatican City =

The Vatican City State, formed in 1929, is the heir of the Papal States, which ceased to exist in 1870. Unlike those, the Vatican does not have a military, except for a small number of Swiss Guards and gendarmes, fulfilling mainly representative and policing duties. For any further defense purposes, the Vatican de facto relies on the Italian state and its military.

== Background ==
The Vatican City State is a neutral nation, which has not engaged in any war since its formation in 1929 by the Lateran Treaty. It has no formal military compact or agreement with neighbouring Italy, although responsibility for defending the Vatican City from an international aggressor is likely to lie primarily with the Italian Armed Forces. When presenting the Lateran Treaty to the Italian parliament in 1929, Benito Mussolini declared: "It is evident that we [the Italian state] will be the necessary guarantors of this neutrality and inviolability [of Vatican City], since, in the remote hypothesis someone wanted to hurt her, he would first have to violate our territory." Although the Vatican City state has never been at war, it was exposed, together with properties of the Holy See in Rome, to bombings during World War II.

== History ==
Although the former Papal States were defended by a relatively large Papal Army (including the Corsican Guard, active from 1603 to 1662) and a Papal Navy, a majority of these forces were disbanded when the Papal States ceased to exist in 1870. Immediately prior to the disbandment, the Esercito Pontificio (Papal Army) comprised two regiments of locally recruited Italian infantry, two Swiss regiments, a battalion of Irish volunteers, artillery and dragoons, plus the international Catholic volunteer corps the Papal Zouaves, formed in 1861 to oppose Italian unification. Following defeat and abolition of the States by the Kingdom of Italy, four small Papal units (the Pontifical Swiss Guard, the Noble Guard, the Palatine Guard, and the Papal Gendarmerie Corps) were retained, but restricted their activity to the Vatican in Rome.

Upon the 1929 formation of the Vatican City State, a unique form of sovereignty was defined. Under this agreement sovereignty is vested in the much more ancient Holy See, which is an ecclesiastical jurisdiction; but that sovereignty is exercised over the actual nation state of the Vatican City, an area of 49 hectares (120 acres) defined in a map appended to the treaty, together with certain other properties formally located within the Italian state, but granted extraterritoriality.

The Vatican City State has never had independent armed forces, but it has always had a de facto military provided by the armed forces of the Holy See: the Pontifical Swiss Guard, the Noble Guard, the Palatine Guard, and the Papal Gendarmerie Corps. In practical terms, these armed forces have operated chiefly within the Vatican City State and the Papal Palace of Castel Gandolfo, and not in the many other extraterritorial properties of the Holy See, except during the time of World War Two when troops of the Palatine Guard were deployed to all papal properties in and around Rome.

As part of a major reform in 1970 by Pope Paul VI, two of the units were disbanded, one was retained, and one was restructured into a civilian police service.

== Active corps ==
=== Pontifical Swiss Guard (est. 1506) ===
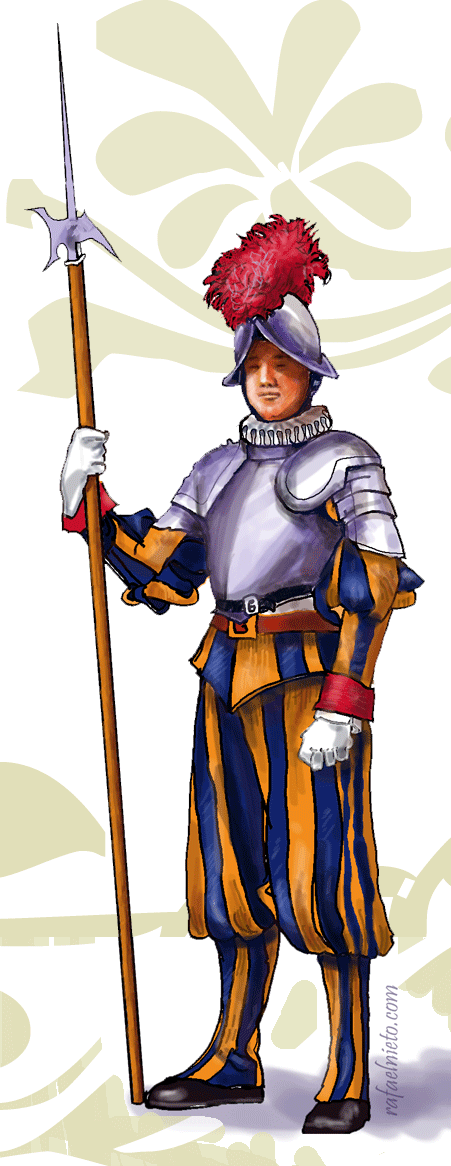

The Pontifical Swiss Guard (Italian: Guardia Svizzera Pontificia) was formed in 1506 by Pope Julius II. The unit was formed as the personal bodyguard of the Pope. At various points in its history the Swiss Guard has seen active service, but following the 1870 abolition of the Papal States it returned to its chief role as a bodyguard, with a limited ceremonial role, and survived into the period of the Vatican City State, as a de facto Vatican military unit from 1929.

The Swiss Guard continues to fulfil the bodyguard function, and provides security at the Apostolic Palace and the Papal Palace of Castel Gandolfo. In cooperation with the Corps of Gendarmerie of Vatican City it also controls access to the entrances to the city-state. Since the attempted assassination of the Pope in 1981 the Swiss Guard has undertaken more rigorous training, and a far more active security role, alongside its traditional ceremonial duties.

Since the early twentieth century the Guard has returned to its original practice of recruiting only Swiss nationals. As of 2005, the Guard had 134 members. All recruits complete basic military training with the Swiss Army before transferring to the Vatican, and must be Catholics and at least 174 cm (5 ft 8.5 in) in height. Members are armed with small arms for practical purposes, and for ceremonial functions the ranks carry the traditional Halberd (also called the Swiss voulge), the Corporals and Vice-corporals either Patisans polearms or Flammenschwert two-handed swords, while officers do not carry weapons, but command batons only.

Although the Pontifical Swiss Guard's first duty is the service of the Pope, during periods of "sede vacante" (when the office of pope is vacant), the Swiss Guard instead guards the College of Cardinals, as they meet to elect a new Bishop of Rome.

=== Papal Gendarmerie Corps (est. 1816) ===
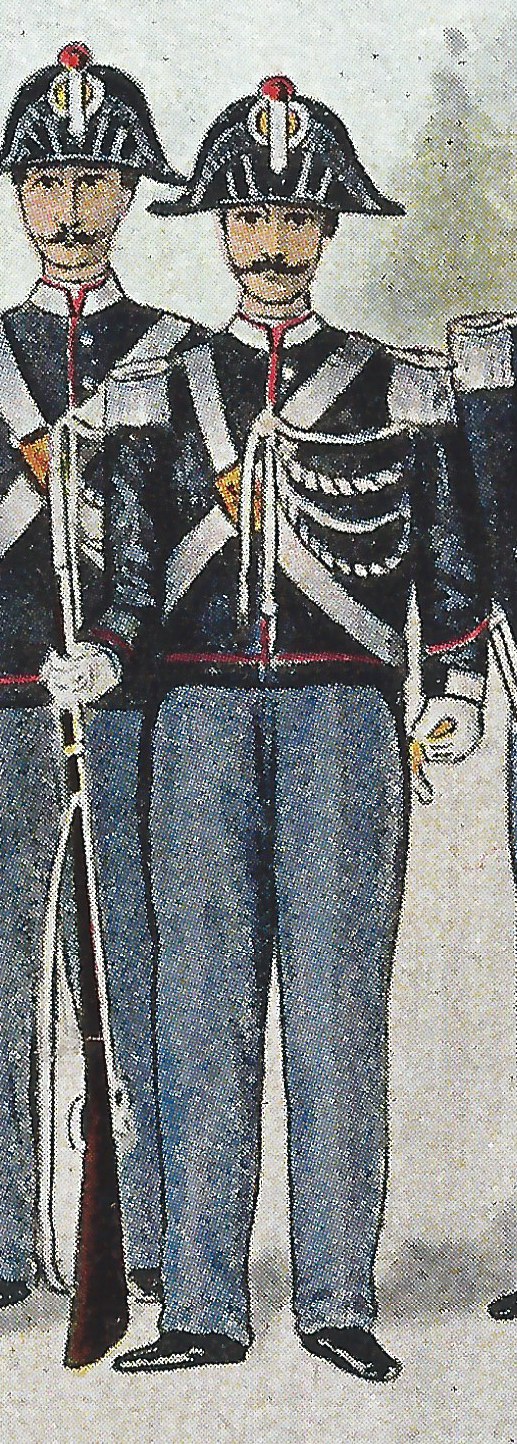

The Papal Gendarmerie Corps (Italian: Corpo di Gendarmeria Papale) was formed in 1816 by Pope Pius VII, originally under the name of Papal Carabinieri Corps. The unit was formed as a military police unit. In 1849 Pope Pius IX renamed it as the Papal Velites Regiment, and subsequently as the Papal Gendarmerie Corps. It saw active military engagements in the battles which culminated in the seizure and abolition of the Papal States. It survived (greatly reduced in size) into the period of the Vatican City State, as a de facto Vatican military unit from 1929 to 1970, providing internal security.

The elaborate ceremonial uniform (of 19th-century origin) included bearskin headdresses with red plumes, black coatees with white-fringed epaulettes, white doeskin breeches, and knee-high riding boots. The day to day service dress uniform included bicorne hats and blue trousers.

In 1970 the corps was transformed into a civilian police unit named the Central Security Office. In 1991 it was renamed the Security Corps of Vatican City State; finally, in 2002 its policing role was redefined, and it was given its current name of Gendarmerie Corps of Vatican City State, a title which links it back to its original military foundation.

The military unit's elaborate ceremonial uniforms continued in use until 1970. These have been simplified, and its structures are all now those of a civilian police service, with modern uniforms and equipment. However, the civilian corps does retain some ceremonial functions, including the provision of the Vatican City State's ceremonial marching band.

== Former corps ==
=== Palatine Guard (1850–1970) ===
The Palatine Guard (Italian: Guardia Palatina d'Onore) was formed in 1850 by Pope Pius IX, through amalgamation of two older units of the Papal Army. The corps was formed as an infantry unit. It saw active service during the token resistance to the occupation of Rome by Italian government troops in 1870, and it survived into the period of the Vatican City State, as a de facto Vatican military unit (including a ceremonial military band) from 1929 to 1970.

In September 1943, when German troops occupied Rome in response to Italy's conclusion of an armistice with the Allies, the Palatine Guard was charged with protecting Vatican City, various Vatican properties in Rome, and the pope's summer villa at Castel Gandolfo. The guardsmen patrolled the walls, gardens, and courtyards of Vatican City, and stood guard at the entrances to papal buildings around Rome. On more than one occasion this service resulted in violent confrontations with Italian fascist police units working with the German authorities to arrest political refugees who were hiding in buildings protected by the Vatican. In September 1939, the Palatine Guard numbered 500 men; by the liberation of Rome in June 1944 the corps had grown to 2,000 men.

Later the Corps returned to its smaller size, and to chiefly ceremonial duties. It was abolished on 14 September 1970 by Pope Paul VI.

=== Noble Guard (1801–1970) ===
The Noble Guard (Italian: Guardia Nobile) was formed in 1801 by Pope Pius VII. The regiment was formed as a heavy cavalry unit. It was part of the Pope's personal guard, providing a mounted escort for the Pope when he travelled in his carriage; it saw no active military engagements. The Guard performed special missions within the Papal States until their abolition, and then continued to function at the Vatican with a limited mounted escort role. It survived (no longer with horses) into the period of the Vatican City State, as a de facto Vatican military unit from 1929 to 1970.

During World War Two members of the unit mounted guard outside the papal apartments by night and day, and guardsmen armed with pistols provided close protection to Pope Pius XII when he took his daily walks in the Vatican Gardens.

During its period as a Vatican City State military unit, the Noble Guard never numbered above 70 men, and apart from the wartime period it performed chiefly ceremonial duties. As its membership was drawn exclusively from families of noble origin (from nobility across Europe) it came to be seen as elitist, and it was abolished on 14 September 1970 by Pope Paul VI.

== See also ==
- Index of Vatican City-related articles
- List of countries without armed forces
- Corps of Firefighters of the Vatican City State
- Papal Military, for historical Papal States military service that is not extant to this day
  - Papal Zouaves
  - Corsican Guard
  - Papal Navy
  - Legion of Antibes
  - Captain General of the Church
  - Gonfalonier of the Church
- Military order (religious society) associated with the Catholic Church
  - Order of the Holy Sepulchre, based in Rome and under the protection of the Holy See
  - Sovereign Military Order of Malta, based in Rome
