= Palatine Guard =

Former military unit of the Vatican

The Palatine Guard (Italian: Guardia Palatina d'Onore) was a military unit of the Vatican. It was formed in 1850 by Pope Pius IX, who ordered that the two militia units of the Papal States be amalgamated. The corps was formed as an infantry unit, and took part in watch-keeping in Rome. The only occasion on which it saw active service was during the token resistance on 20 September 1870 to the occupation of Rome by Italian government troops.

== History ==
After 1870 and the unification of Italy, the corps was confined to Vatican City where they performed ceremonial functions as a guard of honor. The Palatine Guard were usually seen either when the Pope was in Saint Peter's Square, or when a head of state or other important visitors were received by the Pope. Members of the corps were part-time volunteers, who were not paid for their service, though they received an allowance for replacement or repair of their uniforms. The unit lacked modern weapons and the guardsmen received little training beyond drill in marching and presenting arms. The corps was also the only one in the service of the Vatican to have a full military band.

The Second World War was a high point in the history of the Palatine Guard. In September 1943, when German troops occupied Rome in response to Italy's conclusion of an armistice with the Allies, the Guard was given the responsibility of protecting Vatican City, various Vatican properties in Rome, and the Pope's summer villa at Castel Gandolfo. The guardsmen (mainly Roman shop keepers and office clerks) whose service had previously been limited to standing in ranks and presenting arms at ceremonial occasions, now found themselves patrolling the walls, gardens and courtyards of Vatican City and standing guard at the entrances to papal buildings around the Eternal City. On more than one occasion this service resulted in violent confrontations with Italian Fascist police units working with the German authorities to arrest political refugees who were hiding in buildings protected by the Vatican. At the outbreak of the Second World War in September 1939 the Palatine Guard mustered some 500 men, but the German occupation required the recruitment of additional personnel. By the liberation of Rome in June 1944 the corps had grown to 2,000 men, but at the end of the war the majority of these men left the Pope's service and the unit returned to its pre-war force level.

== Uniform ==
Throughout most of its history the Palatine Guard wore a nineteenth-century uniform comprising a shako or kepi, dark blue tunic and light blue trousers. During World War II armed members of the Guard undertook patrols and guard duty in a practical field uniform consisting of grey overalls and red beret.

== Disbandment ==
The corps, along with the Noble Guard, was abolished on 14 September 1970 by Pope Paul VI as part of the reforms of the Church following the Second Vatican Council. Before it stood down it was transformed into the Papal Honor Guard (Guardia d'Onore del Papa). Former guardsmen were invited to join a new group called the Saints Peter and Paul Association (Italian: Associazione SS. Pietro e Paolo), whose statutes were approved by the Pope on 24 April 1971. This civilian association supports charitable, educational, and religious programs in Rome.

== See also ==
- Swiss Guards
- Corsican Guard
- Noble Guard
- Papal Zouaves
- Papal Army
- Military in Vatican City
- Swiss Guard
- Corps of Gendarmerie of Vatican City

== Sources ==
- Levillain, Philippe (2002). The Papacy: Gaius-Proxies. Psychology Press. ISBN 978-0415922302.
