= Meccanotecnica Riesi =

Meccanotecnica Riesi s.r.l.
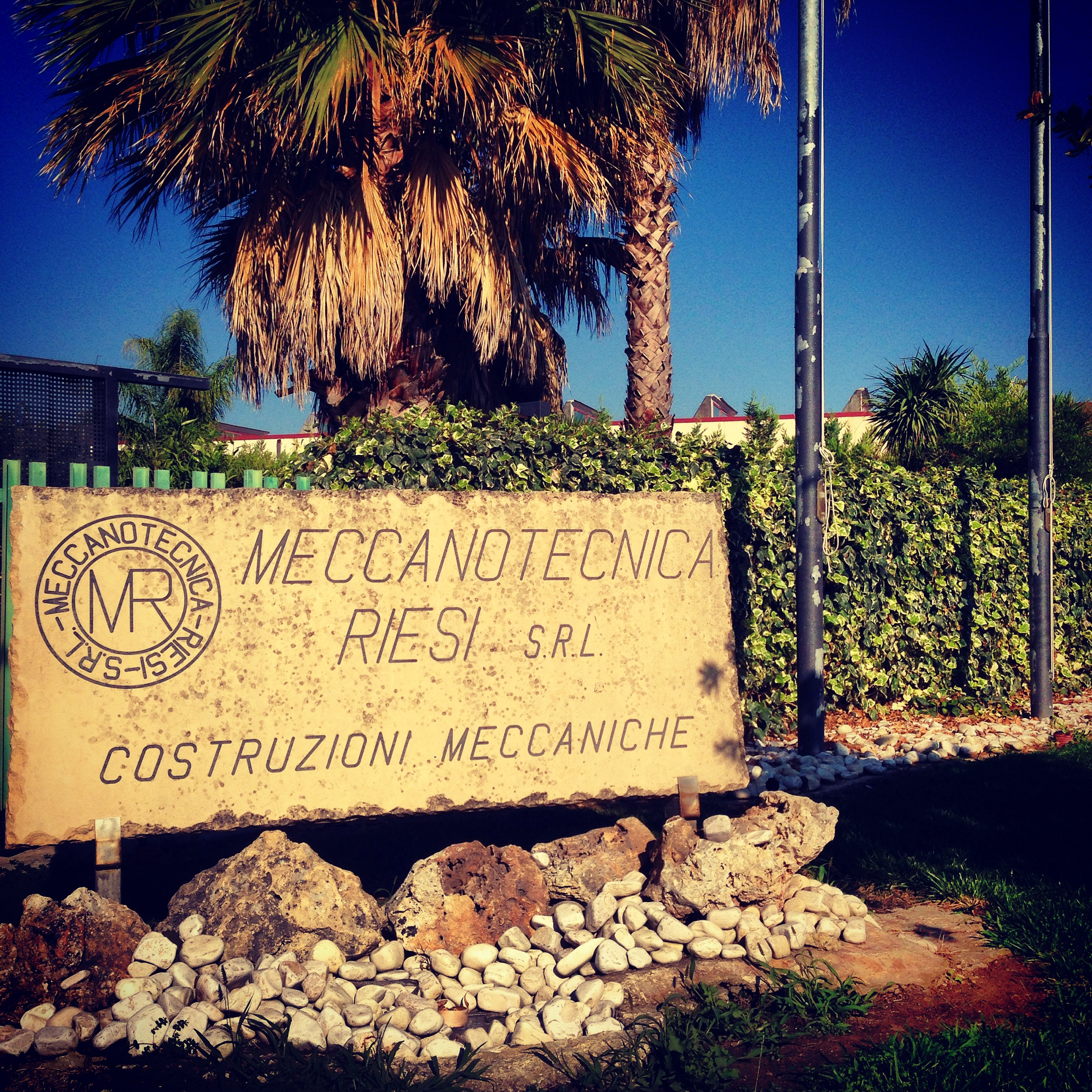
- Sign located outside of MR-XPM's headquarters
- Industry: Engineering, Manufacturing
- Founded: 1992
- Headquarters: Riesi, Italy
- Website: meccanotecnicariesi.com

Meccanotecnica Riesi s.r.l. is a family-owned machine parts manufacturing company headquartered in Riesi, Sicily. It is located along the Caltanissetta-Gela motorway. The company operates both nationally and internationally in a variety of fields including oil, gas, defense, aerospace, offshore production, and research.

== History ==
Meccanotecnica Riesi was first started in a garage by founder Rocco Lo Stimolo in 1992. In 1999 the company expanded and purchased its current headquarters on the outskirts of Riesi in order to meet its growing customer demand. Initially created to address the technical and machine part replacement needs of nearby petrochemical companies, Meccanotecnica Riesi began to expand into other technological fields in 2000. MR-XPM began to diversify with substantial investment in machinery in order to meet a more varied range of industry needs and expand their services. Shortly after this change, MR-XPM began working with a number of companies abroad, most notably firms in Norway and the United States. Between the years of 2004 and 2006 Meccanotecnica Riesi participated in three international trade exhibitions: MEC SPE in Parma (2004), the Arab Oil & Gas show in Dubai (2005), and the Offshore Technology Conference in Houston (2006). A representative of MR-XPM was invited to speak about fostering international partnerships between companies for the Financial Times Manufacturing for the Future Conference in 2008. A year later, MR-XPM became an AgustaWestland approved vendor.

== Projects ==
After expanding their business in 2000, MR-XPM first worked with the Pierre Auger Observatory in Malargüe, Argentina by creating paraboloids specifically for tracking high energy particles. In 2010 Meccanotecnica was selected to contribute to the Large Hadron Collider project in Geneva, Switzerland. Since then, MR-XPM has been involved with projects for the National Institute of Geophysics and Volcanology, among other research institutes.

== Management ==
Rocco Lo Stimolo is the founder and current General Manager of Meccanotecnica Riesi s.r.l. His sons, Giovanni and Angelo, also hold positions at the company as a Production Manager and Director of Finance, respectively. His daughter, Ester Lo Stimolo, works as the Manager of Accounting and Purchasing Department. Meanwhile, Rosy Trovato, Rocco's daughter-in-law, is MR-XPM's Manager of International Business Development.

== University Partnerships ==
Meccanotecnica Riesi has also collaborated with a number of universities. In 2010 Northeastern University partnered with MR-XPM to include them in their international cooperative education program, where students from the school have the opportunity to live abroad and work at the company for a span of six months. The following year, they partnered with both Massachusetts Institute of Technology and the Embry Riddle Aeronautical University. MR-XPM's work with MIT included building a special wheel prototype, while their work with Embry Riddle focused on creating a cryogenic liquid rocket. In addition to an already existing internship and research partnership, Babson College worked with Meccanotecnica in 2013 for their JMCFE project.

== Nuova Meccanica s.r.l. ==
Meccanotecnica has a partnership with Nuova Meccanica s.r.l., their sister company, with which they produce woodworking implements for the Swiss company Oertli.
