= Noble Guard =

Papal household guard unit (1801–1970)

The Noble Guard (Italian: Guardia Nobile) was one of the household guard units serving the Pope, and formed part of the military in Vatican City. It was formed by Pope Pius VII in 1801 as a regiment of heavy cavalry, and abolished in 1970 by Pope Paul VI following Vatican II. Conceived as the Pope's personal guard, the unit provided a mounted escort for the Pope when he moved about Rome in his carriage and mounted guard outside his apartments in the papal palaces. The guardsmen were also available for special missions within the Papal States at the behest of the pope. One of their first major duties was to escort Pius VII to Paris for the coronation of Napoleon in 1804.

== History ==
In 1801 an agitation was started in Rome among the aristocracy to form a bodyguard for the Pope, and an address was sent to Pius VII offering their services gratuitously. In response, the Noble Guard was established on May 11, 1801.

Exclusively a palace guard, the Noble Guard saw no active military service or combat during the several military campaigns that engaged the Papal States between 1801 and 1870. With the unification of Italy and the abolition of the Papal States in 1870, the Noble Guard restricted its activity to the buildings and grounds of the Vatican. Though nominally still a cavalry unit, the unit had little opportunity to deploy on horseback in the limited confines of the Vatican. Two mounted troopers would accompany the papal carriage when the Pope was driven around the Vatican gardens. In 1904, the mounted service was abolished and the last horses were sold off. Originally armed with carbines, pistols and sabers, after 1870 the guardsmen carried only a saber.

The corps was always a volunteer one - its members were not paid for their service, although they received an allowance for their uniforms. Recruits were drawn from noble families in Rome, although in the twentieth century requirements were relaxed in practice to allow nobility from other regions of Italy to join the corps. The guardsmen were expected to hold titles dating back at least 100 years.

The commander of the corps was called the Captain. Command was hereditary in the Barberini and Altieri families, but later passed to the Rospigliosi. One of the subordinate positions within the corps was that of Hereditary Standard-Bearer, who was responsible for carrying the standard of the Catholic Church. This office was held by the Patrizi-Naro-Montoro.

After 1870, the Noble Guard, now reduced to a force of fewer than 70 men, performed mainly ceremonial duties as an honour guard. Guardsmen most commonly appeared in public when the pope presided over ceremonies in Saint Peter's Basilica. When the pope was carried in the sedia gestatoria, Noble Guards walked alongside the papal chair. During the hours reserved for papal audiences, guardsmen also stood in the antechamber of the papal apartments and, on formal occasions, on either side of the papal throne.

During the Second World War, the Noble Guard shared responsibility with the Swiss Guard for the personal security of Pope Pius XII. For the first time since 1870 pistols were issued to duty personnel. Throughout the war, Noble Guards mounted guard outside the papal apartment night and day and guardsmen followed Pius XII when he took his daily walks in the Vatican Gardens.

The Noble Guard was abolished by Pope Paul VI in 1970 as part of the reforms of the Church following the Second Vatican Council. The elitist image of a privileged ceremonial corps was considered to be out of sympathy with a simpler and more inclusive era. A planned farewell audience for the guardsmen with the Pope did not take place and the property of the unit was requisitioned at short notice by the Papal Secretariat of State. Former members of the Noble Guard have a veterans' association, "La Compagnia delle Lance Spezzate" (The Company of the Broken Lances).

== Commanders ==
- Giuseppe, Prince Antici-Mattei, 4th Duke of Giove (1801–1809)
  - Giovanni, 8th Marquess Patrizi-Naro-Montoro (coadjutor: 1801–1804)
- Don Luigi Braschi-Onesti, 1st Duke of Nemi, 1st Prince of Rocca Sinibalda, 1st Marquess of Belmonte Sabino, Count of Falcino, Marquess and Count Braschi-Onesti, Grandee of Spain 1st Class, 1st Prince of the Holy Roman Empire (1814–1816)
- Paluzzo, Prince Altieri, 5th Prince of Oriolo, 5th Prince of Viano, 5th Duke of Monterano, 6th Prince of Rasina (coadjutor: 1801–1814, commander: 1816–1819)
- Francesco Barberini-Colonna, 6th Prince of Palestrina, etc (coadjutor: 1816–1819, commander: 1819–1853)
- Carlo Felice Barberini-Colonna, Duke of Castel Vecchio (later 7th Prince of Palestrina, etc) (coadjutor: 1819–1853, commander: 1853–1878)
- Emilio, Prince Altieri, 7th Prince of Oriolo, 7th Prince of Viano, 7th Duke of Monterano, 8th Prince of Rasina (coadjutor: 1853–1878, commander: 1878–1900)
- Paolo Giuseppe Ange, Prince Altieri, 8th Prince of Oriolo, 8th Prince of Viano, 8th Duke of Monterano, 9th Prince of Rasina (coadjutor: 1895–1900, commander: 1900–1901)
- Camillo Francesco Maria Rospigliosi, Prince of Zagarolo (second son of Clemente Francesco Rospigliosi, 7th Prince Rospigliosi, Prince of the Holy Roman Empire, Prince of Castiglione, Duke of Zagarolo, etc) (1901–1915)
- Giuseppe Camillo Francesco Pietro Borghese-Aldobrandini, Prince Aldobrandini, Prince of Sarsina, 2nd Prince of Meldola, etc (1915–1939)
- Francesco Chigi-Albani della Rovere (third son of Mario, Prince Chigi-Albani della Rovere, 7th Prince of Farnese) (1939–1953)
- Mario Filippo Benedetto del Drago, Marquess of Riofreddo (of the Princes del Drago-Biscia-Gentili, Princes of Mazzano and of Antuni, Marquesses of Riofreddo) (1957–1970); the last Commander

== See also ==
- Corsican Guard
- Palatine Guard
- Papal Zouaves
- Papal nobility
- Black nobility
- Index of Vatican City–related articles
