= Monte degli Ulivi =

Coordinates: 37.275308°N 14.088001°E

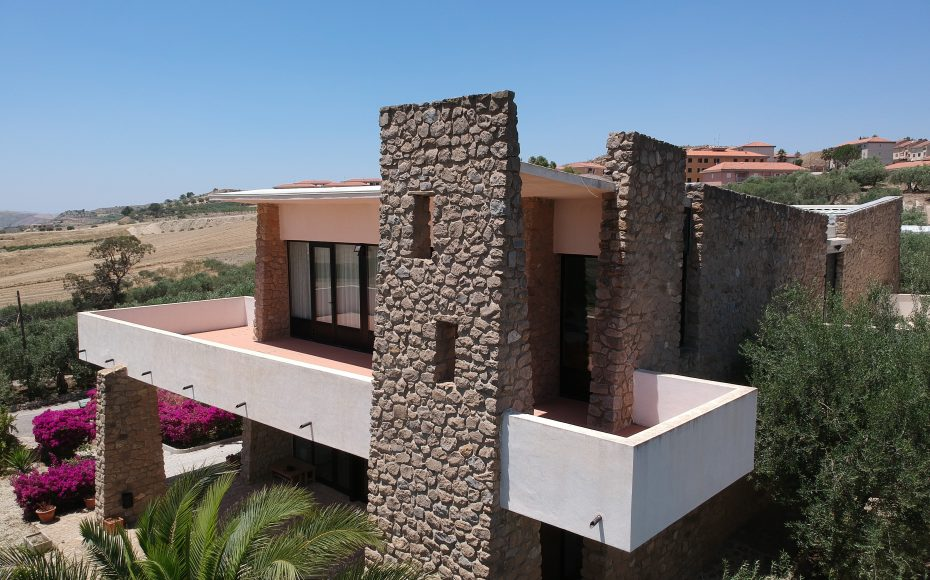
community house

Monte degli Ulivi (Mount of Olives) is a modernist architectural ensemble consisting of six buildings by architect Leonardo Ricci at the southeastern outskirts of the city of Riesi in Sicily. It was built from 1963 to 1966 to house the Servizio Cristiano, an outreach centre founded in 1961 by the Waldensian pastor Tullio Vinay, which has been using and expanding it since.

== Description ==
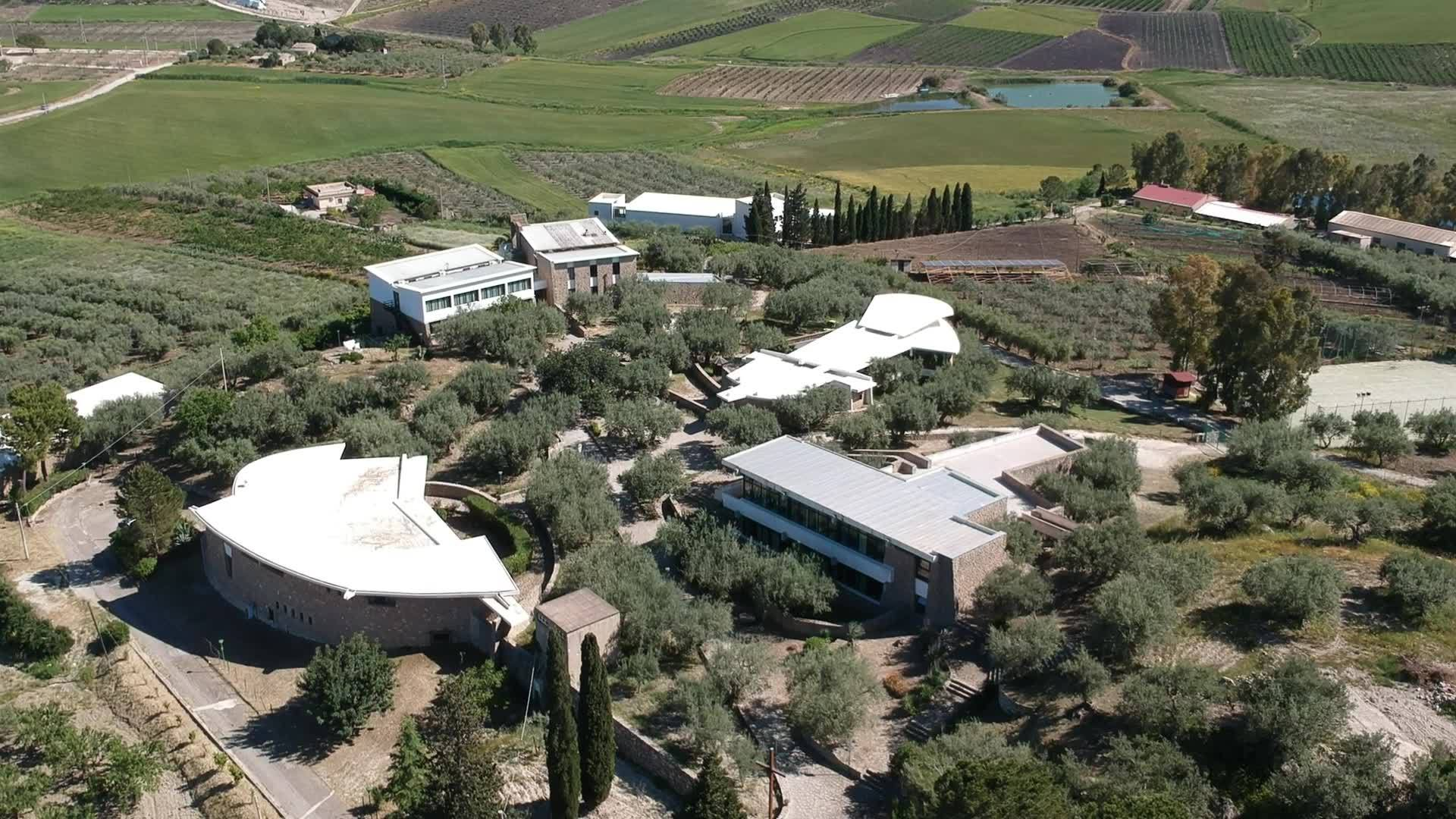
aerial view (2019)

It consists of the following buildings, which are embedded by an olive grove on the slope of a hill:

- community house (Casa Comunitaria) with dining hall, kitchens, and living quarters,
- nursery school (Scuola Materna),
- elementary school (Scuola Elementare),
- vocational school for mechanics (Scuola Officina Meccanica),
- library (Biblioteca),
- house for families (casa per famiglie),

A planned church building (ecclesia) was never realised.

The buildings are characterised by organic, curved monopitch roofs of white-plastered concrete, which stand out against angular walls of raw natural stone. Right angles are rare. In this way, the ensemble refers to Ricci's teacher Giovanni Michelucci and the style of Frank Lloyd Wright on the one hand and connects to the Sicilian landscape on the other hand, because the natural stone used in the walls was sourced in the immediate vicinity.

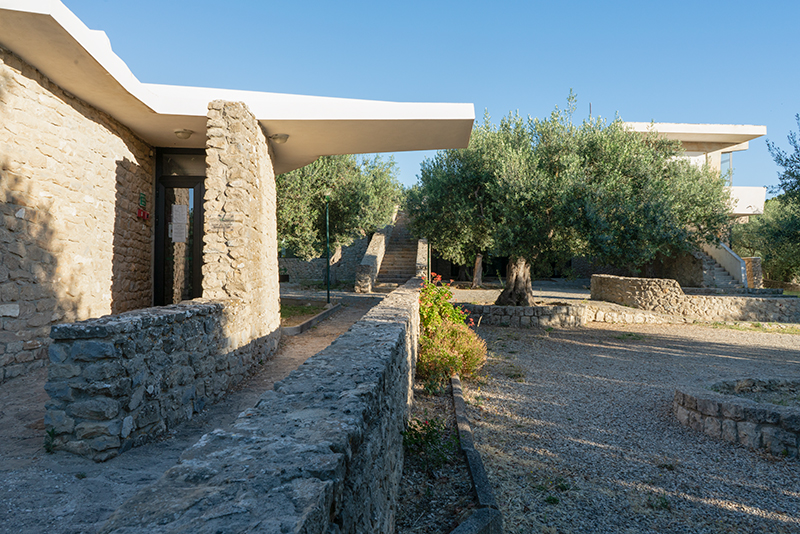
courtyard and nursery school (left)

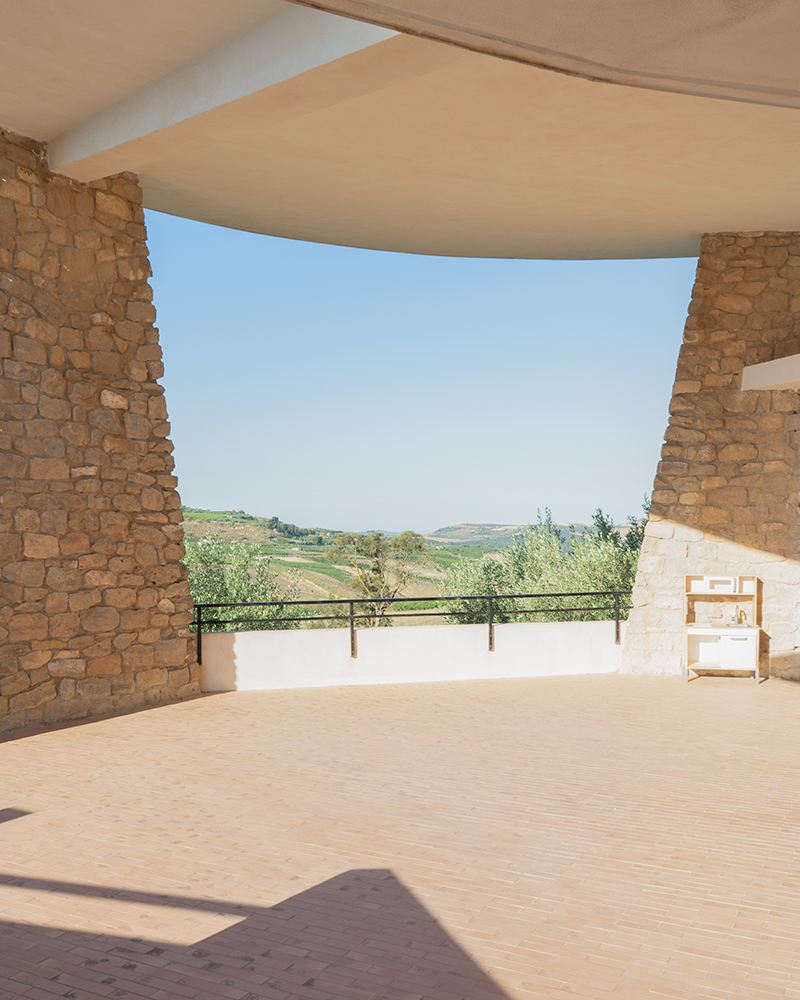
view from the balcony of the nursery school

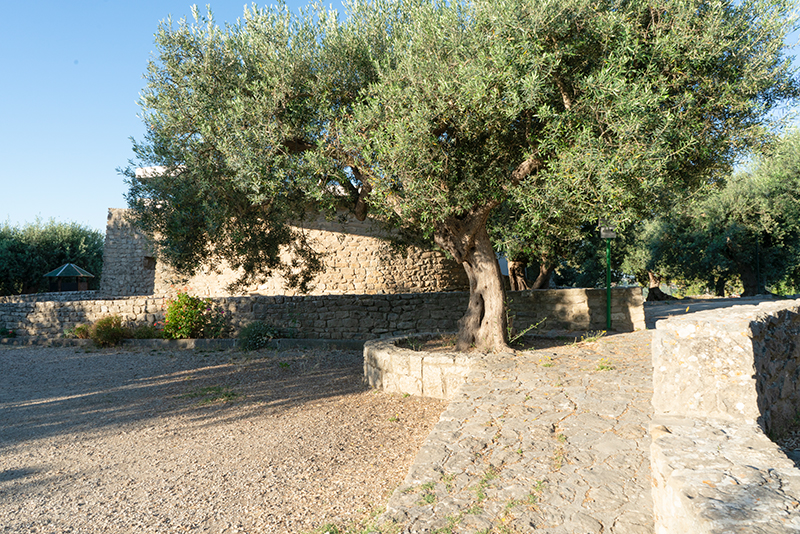
olive tree in front of the elementary school

== History ==
The ensemble was named after the hill on which it stands, but also refers to the biblical Mount of Olives. It was built by local construction companies together with a community of volunteers who founded the outreach centre together with Tullio Vinay. Vinay's motivation was to tackle the poverty, illiteracy, and crime caused by the decline of sulphur mining in the region.

The vocational school building is now used to house offices and as an events space. The initial complex has been expanded with a further guest house, a facility for people with disabilities and a sports field. There also are sheds and water reservoirs for the centre's own agriculture (olives, almonds, vegetables) on the premises. A family advice centre and the church of the Waldensian community dating from the 19th century are located in the city centre.

== Significance ==
The vocational school for mechanics has been called "one of the most characteristic works of the modernist architectural movement in Sicily", and the entire complex has been described as "great architecture", executed with simple means.

The complex was classified as a historical monument in 2008 "for the singularity of the figurative language of informal inspiration and organic influence, the wise relationship with nature and landscape, the particular interpretation of a new idea of community and the design method of the author of undisputed design quality, a significant intervention in the panorama of contemporary architecture in Sicily".

A description on the occasion of Ricci's 100th birthday concluded with the words, "the village of Monte degli Ulivi should be remembered as an experience of significant importance, an urban expression of the continuity of the actions of an entire community; an organism that lends itself to being lived in and where every inhabitant feels alive."
