= Riesi =

- Comune
- Comune di Riesi
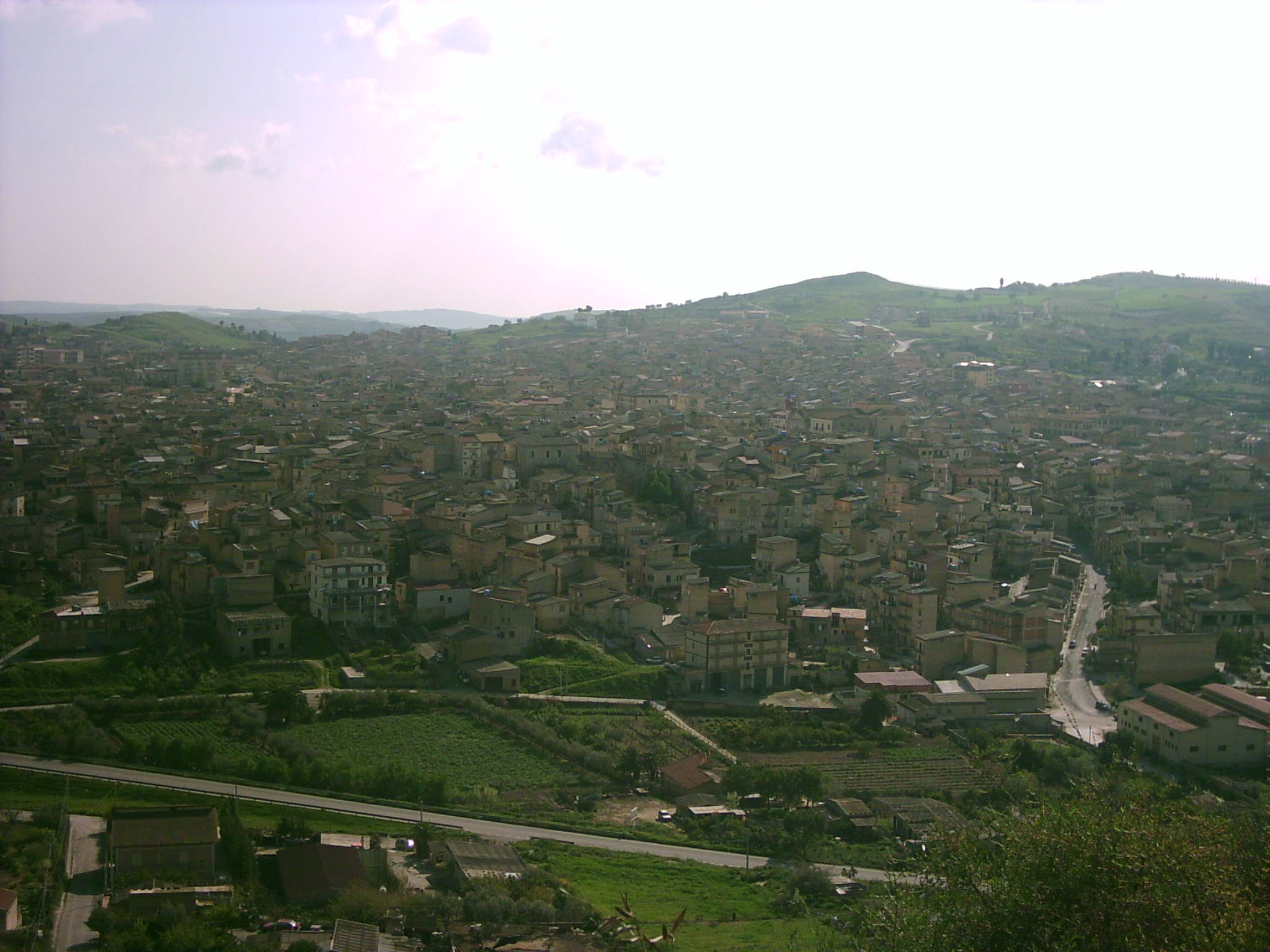

- Coat of arms

- Location within Italy Location within Sicily
- Coordinates: 37°17′N 14°5′E
- Country: Italy
- Region: Sicily
- Province: Caltanissetta (CL)

Government
  - Mayor: Salvatore Chiantia (Democratic Party (Italy))

Area
  - Total: 66.6 km^{2} (25.7 sq mi)
- Elevation: 330 m (1,080 ft)

Population (Dec. 2004)
  - Total: 11,678
  - Density: 175/km^{2} (454/sq mi)
- Demonym: Riesini
- Time zone: UTC+1 (CET)
  - Summer (DST): UTC+2 (CEST)
- Postal code: 93016
- Dialing code: 0934
- Patron saint: Madonna Santissima della Catena
- Saint day: second Sunday in September
- Website: Official website

Riesi is a comune (municipality) in the Province of Caltanissetta in the Italian region Sicily, located about 110 kilometres (68 mi) southeast of Palermo and about 20 kilometres (12 mi) south of Caltanissetta. As of 31 December 2004, it had a population of 11,678 and an area of 66.6 square kilometres (25.7 mi^{2}).

Riesi borders the following municipalities: Barrafranca, Butera, Mazzarino, Pietraperzia, Ravanusa, Sommatino.

== History ==
Riesi was founded in the 13th century. In the period of Arab rule over the island, the area was called "abandoned place" or "fallow".

Until the 1920s, many of the city's inhabitants worked in the nearby sulphur mines "Trabbia" and "Tallarita". The owners of the mine greatly exploited the impoverished population. Many families had to let their children work in the mines as indentured servants in order to survive. As you enter the city today, there is a large memorial commemorating the sufferings of the miners.

In 1961, the Waldensian minister Tullio Vinay founded a Christian outreach centre named "Servizio Cristiano" (Christian service) in the city to fight poverty. In the beginning, the key aims were to promote literacy among children and teenagers, with later initiatives promoting agriculture and vocational training. A modernist architectural complex named "Monte degli Ulivi" (Moint of Olives) was built to house the centre. Today, the Waldensian church operates a kindergarten, an elementary school, a guest house, a family health centre, a rehabilitation centre for the disabled, and a small farm.

== Politics and social situation ==
Riesi suffers from a strong organized crime presence. It is the hometown of Mafia boss Giuseppe Di Cristina. Every year, conflicts within the Mafia lead to casualties. In the spring of 2006, President Giorgio Napolitano dismissed the mayor and the city council from their offices because of evidence of links to organized crime. Until a new city council election in 2008, as in previous such periods, the city was governed provisionally by the regional government in Palermo.

High poverty before the close of World War II and the ongoing difficult social situation have forced many Riesini to emigrate. Popular destinations, apart from the large cities in Italy, have been Belgium and Sweden. Many Riesini still leave their homes after graduating from high school in order to find a job or training in one of Italy's large cities. Therefore, Riesi's actual population lies far below the official number.

== Economy ==
Since the decline of the sulfur industry, the city subsists on agriculture. Olives, almonds, wheat, fruit, artichokes, and other vegetables are cultivated. There are a cooperative and two private oil mills. The wine cooperative of the region is located in Riesi, where it operates a wine press. There is also a small goldsmith manufacturer and a few small mechanical engineering companies, including Meccanotecnica Riesi.

== Religion ==
Traditionally, the population has been Catholic. In the 19th century, the Waldensians, an old Protestant church from Northern Italy, gained influence through missionary activity in many parts of Sicily. For a short period, more than half the population called itself "Waldensians", although they still attended Catholic masses on Sundays. This caused the Curia to send the Salesians of Don Bosco to the island in order to reconvert the converts. Today, only a tiny Waldensian community of about 60 parishioners with their families has remained. Returning emigrants brought foreign confessions to the city. This is why there are also two Pentecostal churches and a kingdom hall of Jehovah's Witnesses.

== Sights ==
- Church of Madonna Santissima della Catena, built in the first half of the 17th century
- Church of San Giuseppe, built in the 19th century
- Architectural ensemble "Monte degli Ulivi" for the institutions of the Servizio Cristiano belonging to the Waldensian church, built in 1963–66, architect Leonardo Ricci, one of the most notable examples of Italian architecture in the 20th century.

== Celebrations ==
- Easter festivities, especially on Good Friday including passion plays, processions and a folk festival
- Church anniversary of Santissima Madonna della Catena on the second Sunday in September with processions and a folk festival
- Church anniversary of St. John Bosco with processions in January

== Demographic evolution ==
Historical population

Year	Pop.	±%
1861	9,226	—
1871	11,565	+25.4%
1881	12,008	+3.8%
1901	14,977	+24.7%
1911	17,253	+15.2%

Year	Pop.	±%
1921	17,073	−1.0%
1931	20,406	+19.5%
1936	19,709	−3.4%
1951	20,437	+3.7%
1961	18,167	−11.1%

Year	Pop.	±%
1971	15,989	−12.0%
1981	15,085	−5.7%
1991	12,506	−17.1%
2001	11,746	−6.1%

Source: Data from ISTAT
