= Corsican Guard =

Military unit of the Papal States

Guardia Corsa
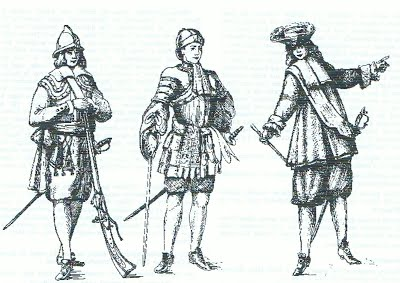
- Soldier, officer and high officer of the Corsican Guard in 1656, after "La Corse militaire", by Marquis Paul D'Ornano (1904)
- Active: 1603–1662
- Country: Papal States
- Type: Guard of honour Militia
- Role: Counterintelligence; Covert operation Force protection Hand-to-hand combat HUMINT; Law enforcement Line formation Pike square Public duties Raiding; Reconnaissance; Screening
- Size: 600–700
- Garrison/HQ: Rome

Commanders
- Notable commanders: Mario Chigi

The Corsican Guard (Italian and Corsican: Guardia Corsa) was a military unit of the Papal States composed exclusively of Corsican mercenaries on duty in Rome, having the functions of an urban militia and guard for the Pope.

Preceded by several militias composed of Corsicans since the fifteenth century, the Corsican Guard was formally founded in 1603 under Pope Clement VIII. The unit was disbanded in 1662 upon request of the French king Louis XIV, following an incident between Corsican soldiers and Frenchmen near the French Embassy in Rome at Palazzo Farnese.

== History ==
=== Origin and formation of the Corsican Guard ===
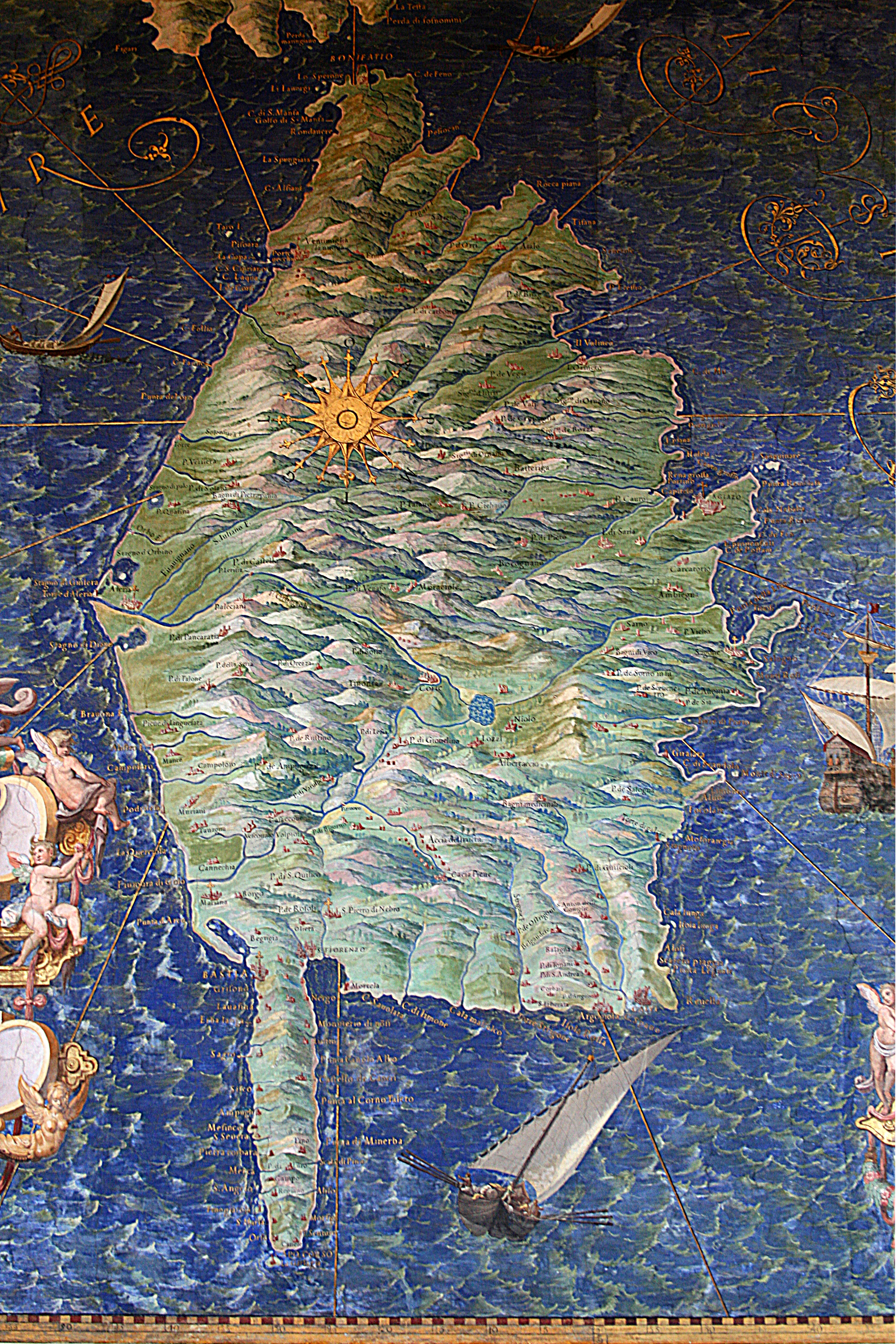
Map of Corsica (1580–83) by Ignazio Danti at the Gallery of Maps in Vatican

The presence of Corsican expatriates in the vicinity of Rome is attested since at least the 9th century, when a small Corsican colony existed in Porto near Fiumicino during the pontificate of Pope Leo IV (r. 847–55); the existence of a Corsican nunnery along the Appian Way is known from the same period. In more recent times, Corsican emigration to Rome slowly began after the end of the Avignon papacy during the 15th century, at which point the city again offered job opportunities to immigrants. Previously, the traditional emigration areas of the Corsicans, pushed to leave their country by the poverty and anarchy reigning in Corsica during the Middle Ages, had been Liguria and Pisa, but during the 15th century Corsicans began to settle in Sienese and Latial Maremma, and from there in Rome. Initially, they were living scattered about in the city's rioni. However, at the onset of 16th century, they were concentrated on Tiber Island and in the part of Trastevere lying between the harbour of Ripa Grande and the church of San Crisogono. The center of their community was the now disappeared Piazza dell'Olmo ("Elm square"). San Crisogono became the national church and cemetery basilica of the Corsican nation in Rome, and over the centuries was used as the burial place of several Corsican military officers. Originally, the Corsicans were only able to find humble jobs in the city and its surroundings, mostly in the areas of sheep breeding and wine trading (the island's wines were much sought after during that period). The only exceptions to the aforementioned trades included becoming a priest, a servant in the Vatican palaces, or a soldier in the employ of the Pope or the Roman baroni; consequently, they did not become well integrated into Roman society.

This situation, together with their fierce character, pushed many Corsican immigrants toward crime; many Corsicans were active as thieves and robbers, both in the city and in the Roman Campagna. Although the Corsicans were certainly not the most turbulent group of immigrants in the city, the reputation they gained in this way was so bad that the Papacy issued numerous laws against them, among them the decree issued in 1475 by Pope Sixtus IV (r. 1471–84) that forbade Corsicans from settling in the city unless they were able to pay a caution of two hundred ducati each and explicitly promised in advance not to bear weapons, or that issued in 1500 under Pope Alexander VI (r. 1493–1503), which ordered the expulsion of all the Corsicans from Rome and the Papal States.

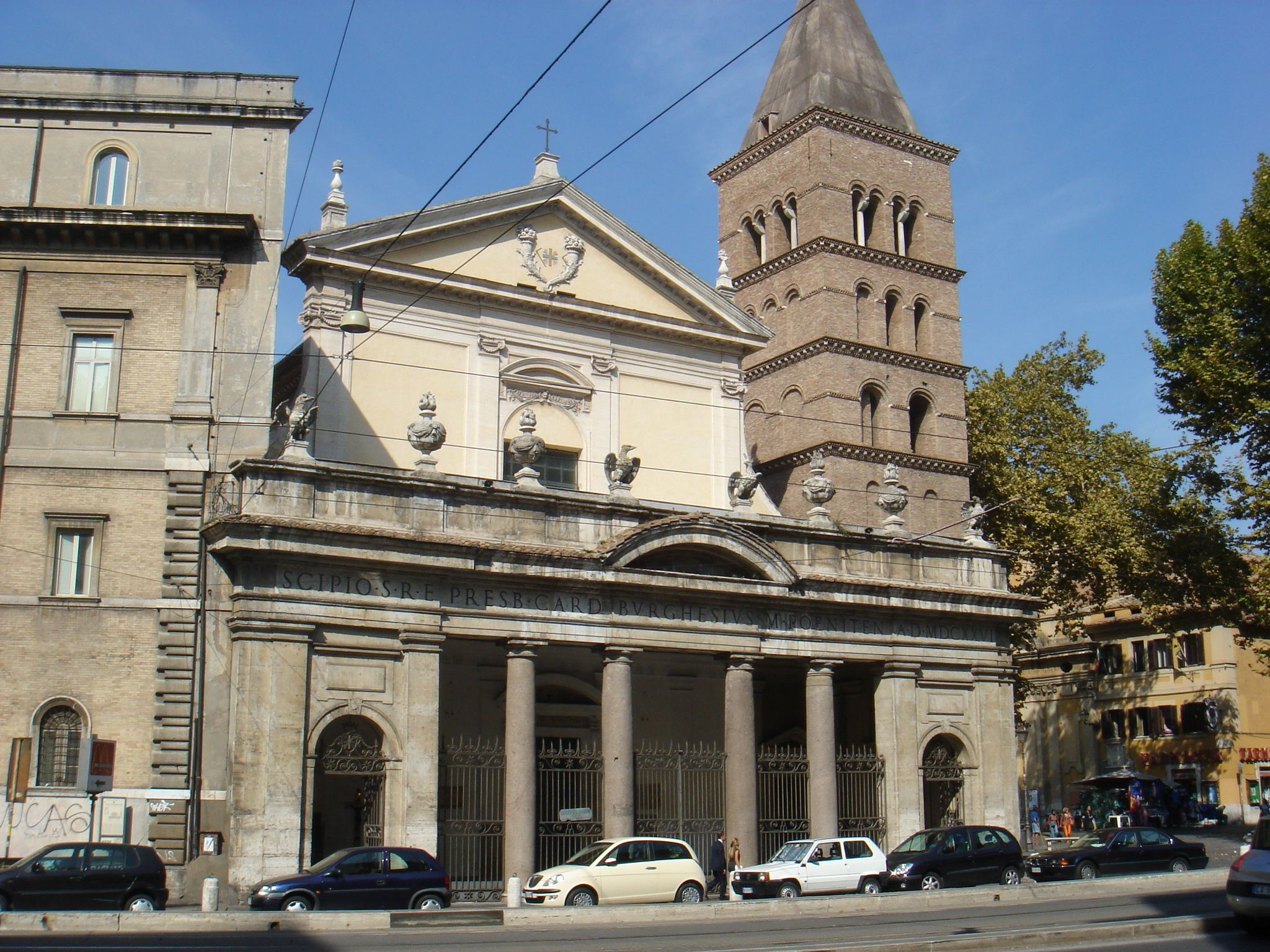
San Crisogono, until 1768 the national church of the Corsicans in Trastevere, Rome, burial place of several Corsican military officers

In practice, though, all of these decrees went unenforced, and their only effect was to improve group morale of the Corsicans in Rome, which began to integrate successfully into 16th-century Roman society. In Renaissance Italy, Corsicans had the reputation of being courageous men; in the Gallery of Maps in the Vatican, painted between 1580 and 1583, Italian cartographer Ignazio Danti wrote in the cartouche above the map of the island: "Corsica has received four major gifts from Nature: its horses, its dogs, its proud and courageous men and its wines, most generous, that princes hold in the highest esteem!". Consequently, it was not difficult for Corsicans to find employ as soldiers in the service of the popes, often attaining officer rank and high social status. These mercenaries formed the nucleus of a Corsican militia that preceded the establishment in 1506 of the better known and still existing Swiss Guard. Between 1468 and 1471, four companies of heavy cavalry composed of Corsican knights were enrolled by the Pope. During the reigns of Popes Alexander VI and Julius II (r. 1503–13), these companies were reinforced. In 1528, after the rout of Marshal Lautrec in Naples, the remains of the French army moved north through the Papal States. Among them were Corsican bands in the service of France, amounting to 3,000 men. Six hundred of them stopped in Rome, and there took service under Clement VII (r. 1523–34). Among these troops were the compagnie di ventura (mercenary bands) of Condottieri Sampiero Corso and Raffaello Corso.

In 1543 the members of the Corsican militia living in Trastevere asked the Pope for permission to establish the Arciconfraternita della Madonna del Carmine, with its seat in San Crisogono. Over time, this confraternity became one of the most important in Rome; still existing to this day, it is responsible for one of the most traditional Roman feasts, the Festa della Madonna de noantri ("Feast of our Virgin Mary" in Romanesco), which takes places each year in July in Trastevere.

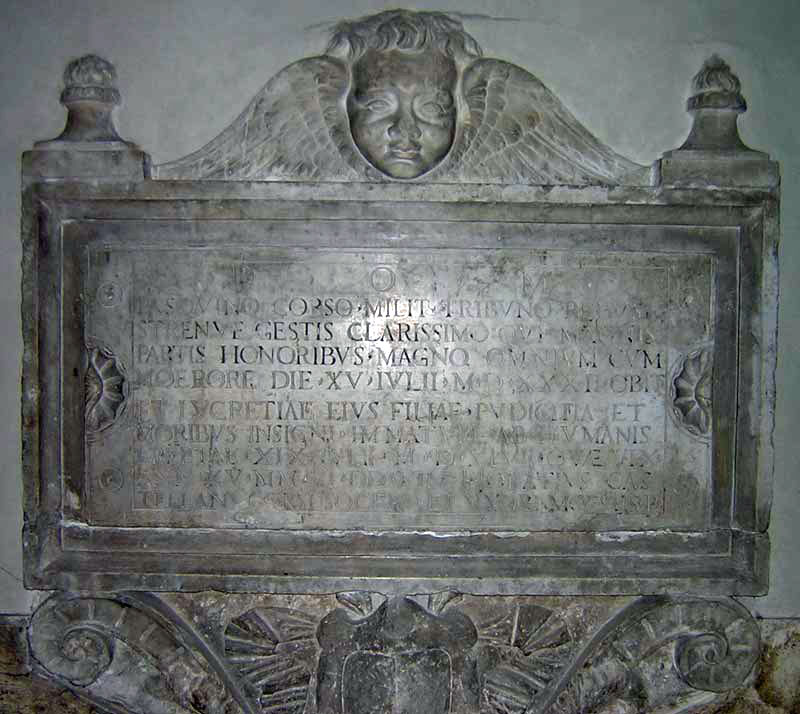
Funerary monument in San Crisogono of Pasquino Corso (d. 1532), colonel of the Corsican militia

In 1603 Pope Clement VIII (r. 1592–1605) recruited in Corsica six hundred infantrymen. This act marks the official beginning of the Corsican Guard. The soldiers were quartered in the rione Regola, between the church of the Santissima Trinità dei Pellegrini and that of San Paolino, not far from Ponte Sisto, and in rione Ponte, at Vicolo dei Soldati ("Soldiers' Lane"), which got its name from another barrack occupied by Corsican soldiers. Another place frequented by the soldiers was Vicolo dell'Armata ("Army Lane"), also in Regola, a short side lane connecting Via Giulia with the shore of the Tiber, where there existed an inn, the Osteria dell'Armata ("Army Inn"), so called because it was attended by Corsican soldiers belonging to the Pope's guard.

According to contemporary diplomat Fulvio Testi, the Corsican Guard was reinforced in 1637 when, because of an increase of criminality in the city, Pope Urban VIII (r. 1623–44) recruited four hundred Corsican soldiers. However, according to Testi, their arrival did not improve the situation.

Corsicans were notorious in Rome for their tendency to engage in fights and brawls, and the soldiers of the guard were no exception. Under the reign of Urban VIII, on April 21, 1642, Easter Monday, a fight broke out among Corsican soldiers and the Corazze ("cuirasses"), another Papal corps composed almost exclusively of men from Bologna, who were quartered at the slope of S. Onofrio on the Gianicolo hill. Two Corsicans died, and only the intervention of Cardinal-Nephew Francesco Barberini, who approached from nearby St. Peter's Basilica, put an end to the fight. The Corsicans did not give up, and during the following days fights broke out at Via della Lungara, Tor di Nona and Castel Sant'Angelo. Merchants and shopkeepers in Via dei Coronari and the surrounding lanes of rione Ponte were forced to barricade themselves, fearing the sacking of their homes and shops. In the end, only another intervention by Cardinal Barberini and many soldiers on May 2 ended the fights. On the following day, gallows were set up near the hospital of Santo Spirito, in Borgo, and seven Corsican soldiers were hanged. Another one, who had killed a wounded corazza while a friar of Sant'Agostino was confessing him, was executed by hitting his head with a mallet.

=== End of the Corsican Guard ===
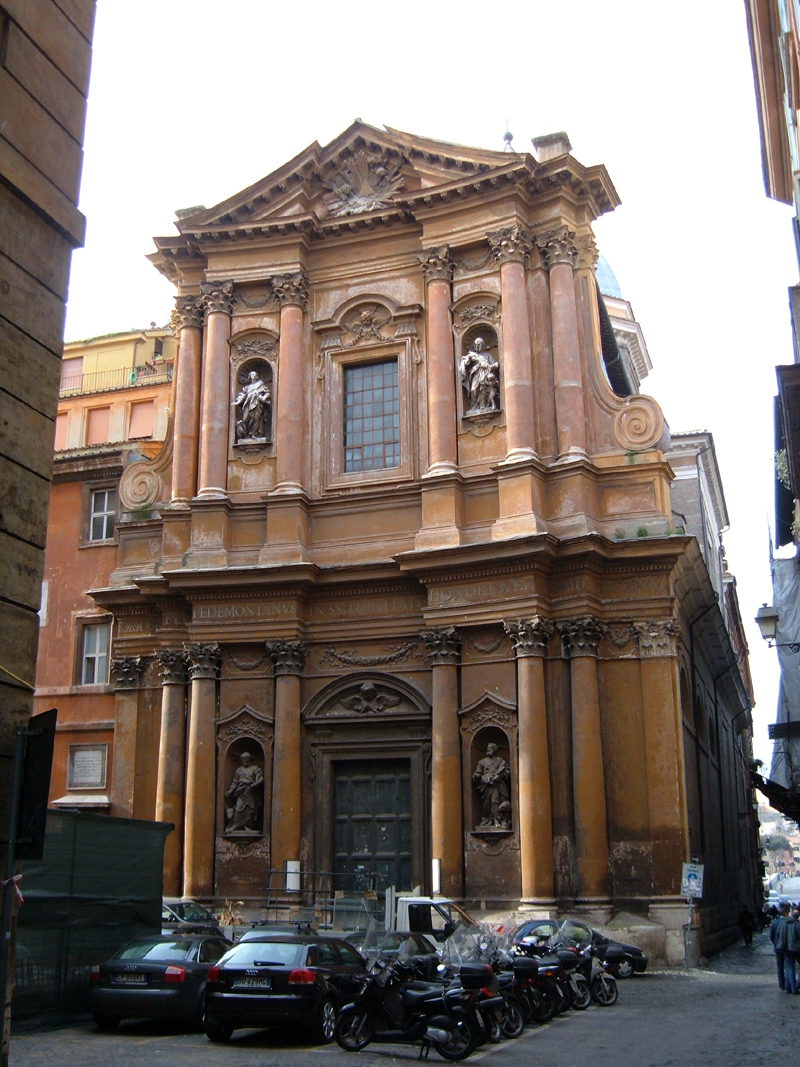
Church of the Trinità dei Pellegrini in Rome. Between this shrine and that of San Paolo alla Regola lay barracks of the Guard.

The end of the Corsican Guard, triggered by an incident that occurred in Rome on August 20, 1662, gives an insight into the evolution of the geopolitical situation in Europe and on the growing French influence in Italy. Toward the middle of the 17th century, the presence in Rome of numerous diplomatic missions of the European states ended up creating a paradoxical situation in which the major powers – through over-extension of the concept of extraterritoriality, the so-called "liberty of quarters" – had in some cases provided their embassies with real military garrisons (whose soldiers were free to bear weapons throughout the city), leading to the transformation of entire areas of the city center into free zones, where criminals and killers could find refuge, untouchable by the law.

Pope Alexander VII Chigi (r. 1655–67) tried to limit these excesses and was soon satisfied by the actions of both Spain and the Holy Roman Empire. In contrast, Louis XIV of France (r. 1643–1715), who was hostile to the Pope, sent to Rome his cousin Charles III, Duke of Créqui, as Extraordinary Ambassador together with a reinforced military escort, in order to antagonize the Roman court and the Pope's family. The ambassador's task was apparently to sabotage the pope's effort to create an anti-Ottoman alliance. Regarding the liberty of quarters issue, Créqui demanded that the pope extend it well behind the limit of Palazzo Farnese, including via Giulia, which was part of the way along which the Corsican soldiers had to walk each day in order to reach the Carceri Nuove (the state prison) from their barracks at the Trinità dei Pellegrini. The commander of the Guard, Don Mario Chigi, reacted to that by ordering 150 soldiers to patrol the streets of Rome.

On August 20, 1662, a serious brawl at the Ponte Sisto erupted between Corsican soldiers controlling the bridge and Frenchmen belonging to the retinue of the French ambassador. The affront must have been particularly serious (many more such incidents are reported since 1661, but without serious consequences), because even the soldiers at rest in the barracks of the Guard at the Trinità dei Pellegrini near Palazzo Spada came to besiege the nearby Palazzo Farnese, residence of the French ambassador, demanding the delivery of the Frenchmen responsible for the clash. A shootout followed, triggered by the casual return to Palazzo Farnese, under heavy French military escort, of the wife of the ambassador. A page of Lady Créqui was mortally wounded, and Louis XIV took advantage of the incident to escalate the confrontation with the Holy See, already started under the government of Cardinal Mazarin.

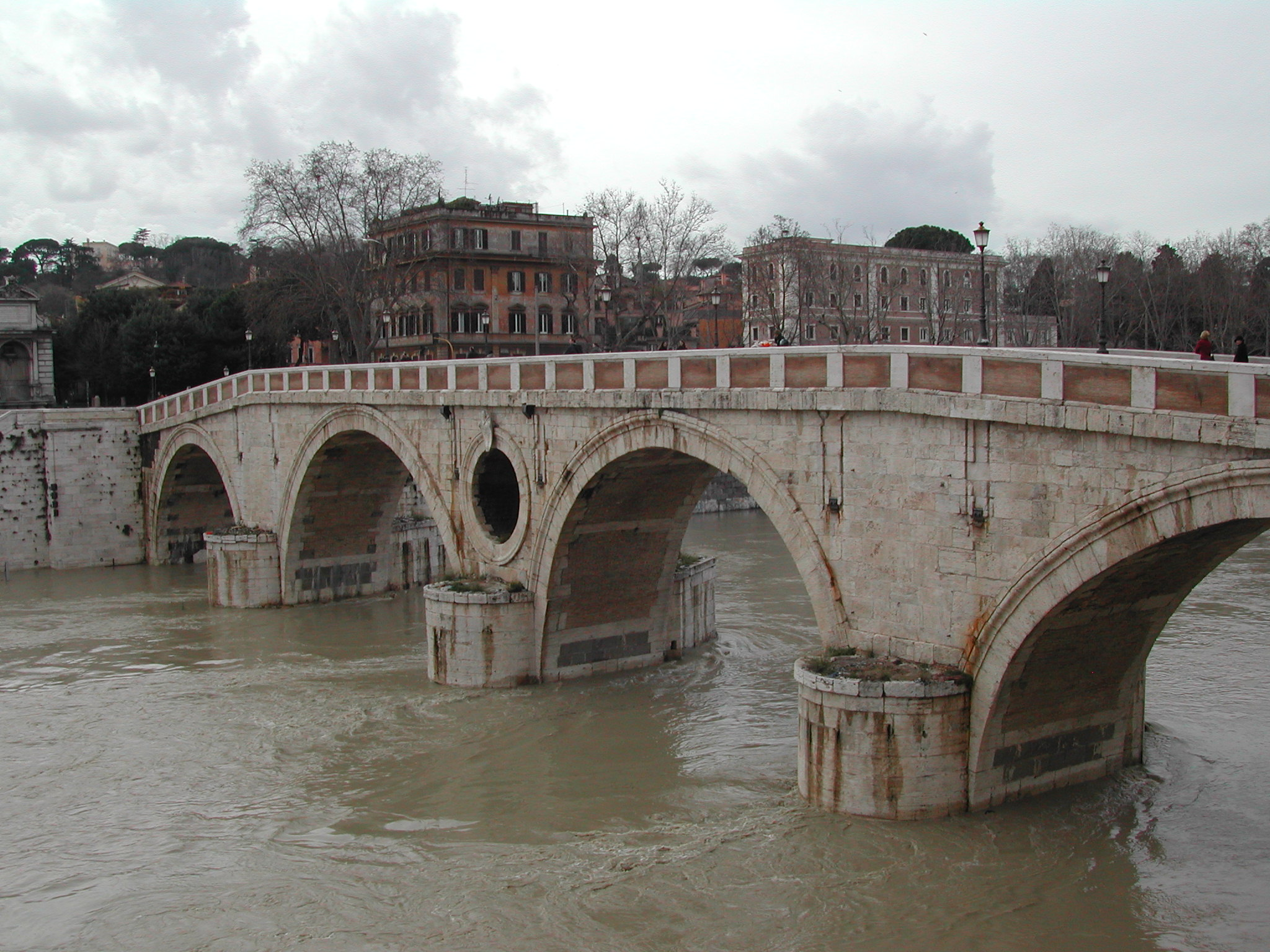
Ponte Sisto. On August 20, 1662, the fight that initiated the disbanding of the Corsican Guard started here.

The Pope and the Governor of Rome, Cardinal Lorenzo Imperiali, acknowledged the gravity of the incident at once, and dismissed the Corsicans immediately, nominating a commission to decide the amount of the indemnity to France. However, the Duke refused any accommodation and on September 1 left Rome for Tuscany, accompanied by the Cardinals of the French faction.

The reaction of the King of France and the claims he made against the Pope give an indication of his power, but also of his personality and of the methods he was willing to use. After the withdrawal of his ambassador from Rome, he expelled the papal nuncio in France, proceeded to annex the French papal territories of Avignon with the Comtat Venaissin, and threatened to invade Rome if Alexander VII failed to apologize and bow to his wishes.

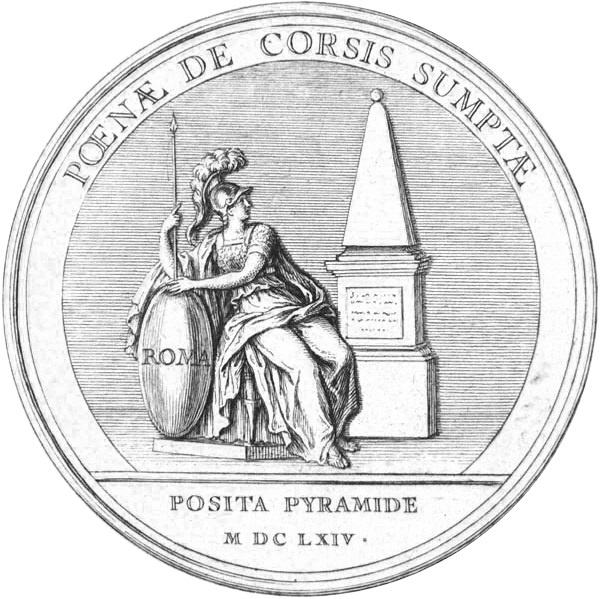
Etching representing a medal minted under Louis XIV to commemorate the disbanding of the Corsican Guard; the "pyramid of infamy" is in the background

These included the immediate dissolution of the Corsican Guard, the issuing of an anathema against Corsica, the hanging in retaliation of a number of soldiers and condemnation to service in galleys as rowers for many others, the removal of Cardinal Imperiali from his office of Governor of Rome, the banishment of the commander of the Guardia Corsa, Mario Chigi, brother of the Pope, and the erection near the barracks of the Guard by the Santissima Trinità dei Pellegrini of a "pyramid of infamy" which would curse forever the Corsicans who had dared to challenge French authority.

The Pope at first opposed the terms and tried to prevaricate, but the threat of a descent of the French army onto Rome gradually persuaded him to accede to the king's will. With the humiliating Treaty of Pisa signed on February 12, 1664, the Corsican Guard was disbanded forever and some soldiers hanged, the pyramid of infamy was erected, and Mario Chigi was exiled from Rome. In exchange, the seized papal territories were returned, but in July, in Fontainebleau, the Cardinal-nephew and son of Mario, Flavio Chigi, was forced to humiliate himself and present the apologies of Rome to the King of France, who four years later gave permission to demolish the monument of infamy.

During the negotiations, Louis XIV had taken the opportunity to expand his influence in Italy, portraying himself as the protector of the Italian principles. Because of that, he forced the Pope, always in the context of repairs for the Corsican Guard affair, to return Castro and Ronciglione to the Duke of Parma and to compensate Francesco II d'Este, Duke of Modena, for his rights over Comacchio.

== See also ==
- Swiss Guards
- Papal Army
- Military of Vatican City
- Noble Guard (Vatican)
- Palatine Guard
- Pontifical Swiss Guard
- Papal Zouaves
- Corps of Gendarmerie of Vatican City

== Sources ==
- Ceccarelli, Giuseppe (Ceccarius) (1940). Strada Giulia (in Italian). Rome: Danesi.
- Delli, Sergio (1975). Le strade di Roma (in Italian). Rome: Newton Compton.
- Esposito, Anna (1986). "La presenza dei corsi nella Roma del Quattrocento. Prime indagini nei protocolli notarili". Mélanges de l'École française de Rome: Moyen Âge (in Italian). 98 (98–2). Rome: 607–621. doi:10.3406/mefr.1986.2876.
- "Guardia Corsa". guardia-corsa.adecec.net (in French).
- Paita, Almo (1998). La vita quotidiana a Roma ai tempi di Gian Lorenzo Bernini (in Italian). Milan: Rizzoli. ISBN 8817172308.
- Rosa, Mario (1960). "Papa Alessandro VII" (in Italian). Dizionario Biografico degli Italiani.
- Stumpo, Enrico (1986). "Flavio Chigi". www.treccani.it (in Italian). Dizionario Biografico degli Italiani.
- Von Pastor, Ludwig (1940). "History of the Popes". archive.org. Hertford: Kegan Paul, Trench, Trubner.
