= Papal Zouaves =

- Zuavi Pontifici
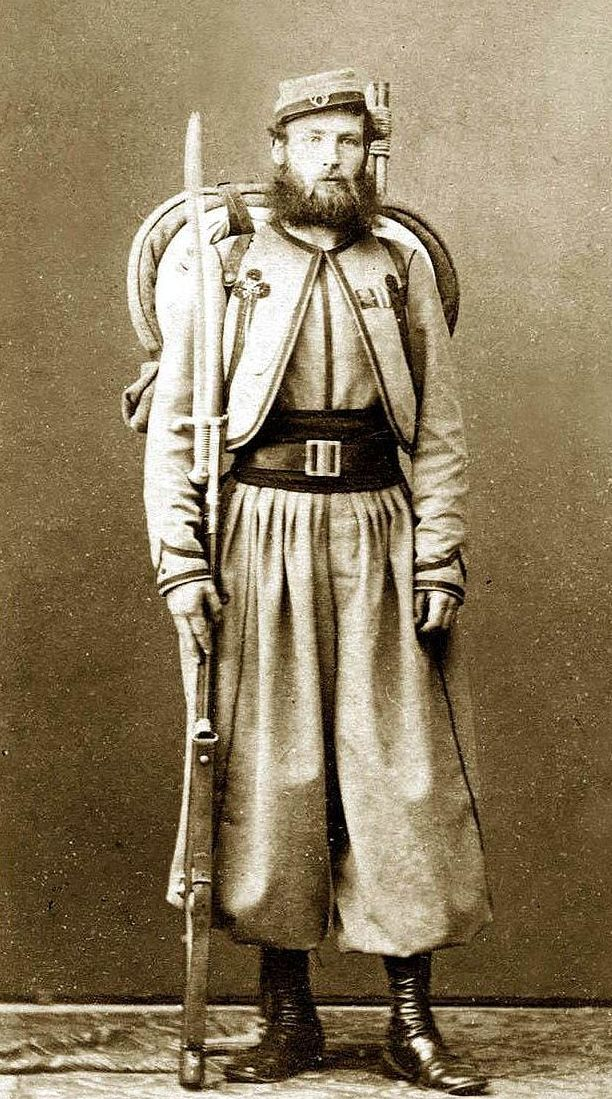
- Papal Zouave c. 1865
- Active: 23 May 1860 – September 1870
- Country: Papal States
- Allegiance: Pope Pius IX
- Branch: Papal Army
- Type: Zouave
- Role: Infantry
- Engagements: Italian Unification; Battle of Castelfidardo; Battle of Mentana; Capture of Rome

Commanders
- Commander: Eugène Allet

The Papal Zouaves (Italian: Zuavi Pontifici) were an infantry battalion (later regiment) dedicated to defending the Papal States. Named after the French zouave regiments, the Zuavi Pontifici were mainly young men, unmarried and Catholic, who volunteered to assist Pope Pius IX in his struggle against the Italian unificationist Risorgimento.

== Origin ==
The Zouaves evolved out of a unit formed by Louis Juchault de Lamoricière on 23 May 1860, the 'Company of Franco-Belgian Tirailleurs'. The company was quickly increased to an 8-company battalion by amalgamating the Tirailleurs with another volunteer unit, the 'Crusaders of Cathelineau'.

On 1 January 1861 the unit was renamed the Papal Zouaves, after already proving themselves in 1860. The name had been introduced by Xavier de Mérode. The Almoner was Mgr. Edouard de Woelmont.

== Composition ==
The unit was commanded by the Swiss colonel Eugène Allet (1814–1878), from Leuk, who had previously served in the Pontifical Swiss Guard under Pope Gregory XVI. All orders were given in French.

From 1867 to 1868, the Papal Zouaves increased their strength from that of a single battalion to a four-battalion regiment, each battalion having six active and one depot company.

Initially, the French and Belgian unit was mostly composed of young aristocrats and gentlemen. Later on, the unit was truly international, and by May 1868 numbered 4,592 men. A British volunteer, Joseph Powell, noted in his account of his service with the Papal Zouaves that at least three individuals of African descent and one person from China served in the Zouaves.

Composition of the regiment in May 1868
Ethnicity of the people	No. of people
Dutch	1,910
French	1,301
Belgians	686
Italians (Romans and Pontifical subjects)	157
Canadians	135
Irish	101
Germans (Prussians)	87
English	50
Spaniards	32
Germans (beyond Prussia)	22
Swiss	19
Americans	14
Italians (Neapolitans)	14
Italians (Modenese)	12
Poles	12
Scots	10
Austrians	7
Portuguese	6
Italians (Tuscans)	6
Maltese	3
Russians	2
South Sea Islands	1
India	1
Africa	1
Mexico	1
Peru	1
Circassia	1

Between February 1868 and September 1870, the number of Canadian volunteers, mainly from the Francophone and majority Catholic province of Quebec, rose to seven contingents numbering some 500 men in total – with a contingent of 114 turning back to Canada because news had reached them of the surrender of the Papal States in September 1870.

== Operational history ==
=== Peacetime service ===
In addition to involvement in the suppression of brigandage between 1864 and 1868, the Papal Zouaves were employed in humanitarian relief when a cholera epidemic devastated Albano during early 1867. All members of two companies of the 1st Battalion were decorated by Pope Pius IX for their work in burying the dead and tending to the infected.

=== The Battle of Mentana ===
One thousand five hundred Papal Zouaves assisted in the notable Franco-Papal victory at the Battle of Mentana, fought on 3 November 1867 between French-Papal troops and Italian volunteers led by Giuseppe Garibaldi.

In his report to the Pope, the commander of the Papal forces, General Kanzler, praised the elan of the Zouaves, citing a determined bayonet charge as a particular example.

The Zouaves suffered the brunt of the fighting, sustaining 81 casualties in the battle, including 24 killed (the Papal forces suffered only 30 dead in total) and 57 wounded. The official French report of the battle prepared by the French commander, General de Failly, also cited the bravery of the Papal Zouaves. The youngest victim, aged seventeen, was English Zouave Julian Watts-Russell. Two Canadian Zouaves were present at the battle, one of which was Alfred LaRoque who was wounded during the battle and would later go on to receive the Mentana Cross and the Benemerenti medal for his actions during the 1867 campaign and was sent back to Canada by Pope Pius IX in order start a recruit campaign for the Papal Zouaves among Canadian youths.

=== Last days of the Papal States ===
The Zouaves also played a role in the final engagements against the forces of the newly united Kingdom of Italy in September 1870, in which the Papal forces were outnumbered almost seven to one. The Zouaves fought off enemy lancers on the 13th, withdrew with Papal artillery under heavy fire on the 20th and made preparations for a counterattack against the Italians before being told of the surrender at the Capture of Rome.

Several Zouaves were executed or murdered by the Italian forces following the surrender, including a Belgian officer who refused to give up his sword.

== Aftermath ==
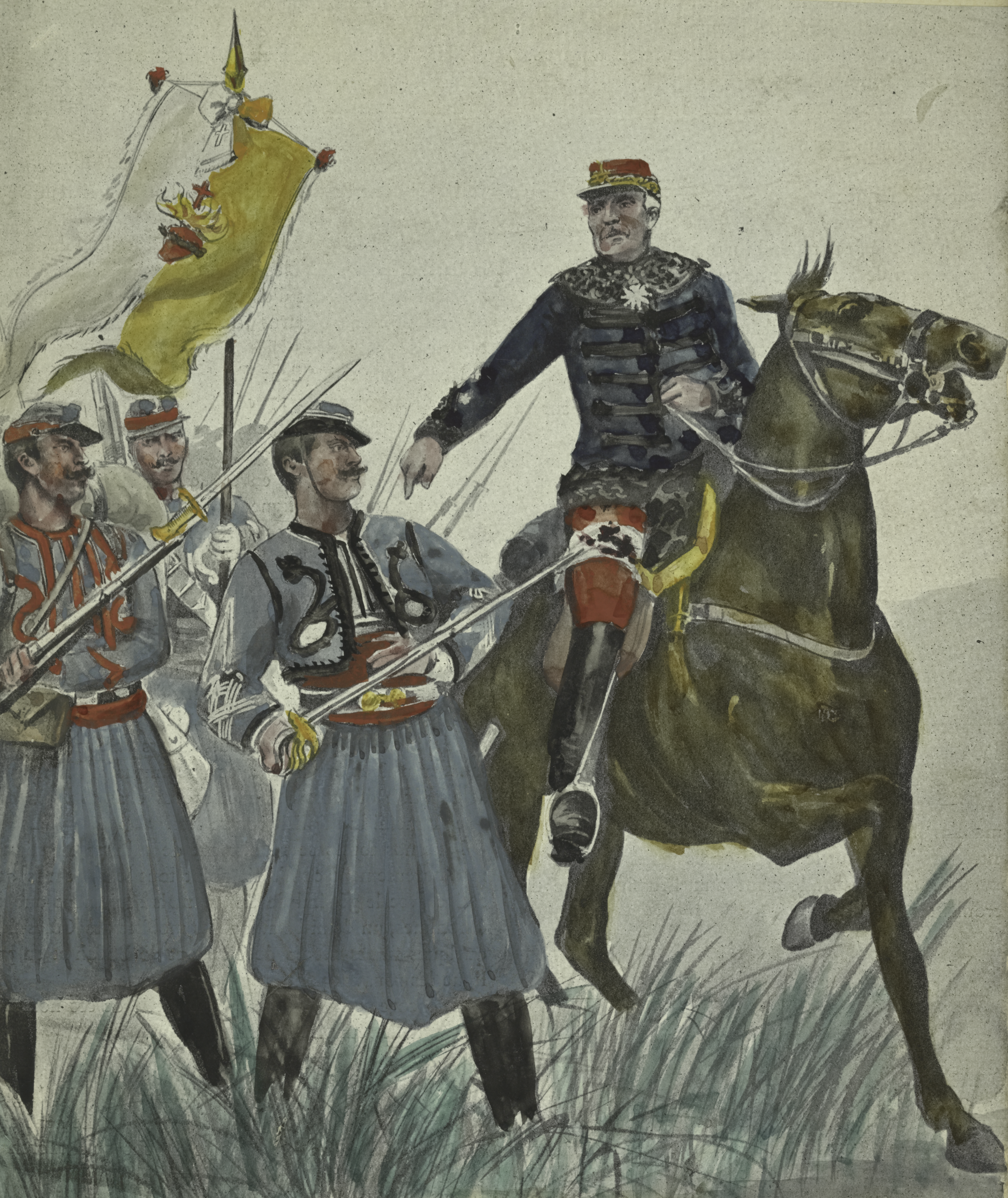
Ex-Papal Zouaves fighting under their distinctive banner in France, 1870

After being disbanded, veterans of the Papal Zouaves fought on in other units, for example, on the side of the Carlists in the Third Carlist War and on the side of the French in the Franco-Prussian War.

=== Franco-Prussian War ===
After the Capture of Rome by Victor Emmanuel in 1870, 760 French soldiers of the disbanded Papal Zouaves, led by Colonel de Charette, offered the French Government of National Defense their service. They were renamed as Légion de Volontaires de l’Ouest (Legion of the Volunteers of the West) and, by 7 October 1870, the contingent, composed of 64 officers, 1,620 men, 80 cavalry, 80 gunners, was organised into:

- three 6-company battalions, plus three depot companies
- squadron of mounted éclaireurs
- mountain battery

While retaining their grey and red Papal uniforms, the Zouaves fought the Prussians and their other German allies outside Orléans, with 15 killed or wounded between 11 and 12 October 1870, and also engaged the enemy at Patay. Expanded to two battalions totalling about 1,800 men, the new force with its experienced core of former Papal Zouaves fought with distinction at the Battle of Loigny where the 2nd Battalion charged with the bayonet, losing 216 out of 300 men (18 officers and 198 men) while covering the retreating and shattered 16th Corps. The Volontaires were armed with Chassepots and Remingtons. The unit was disbanded after the entrance of Prussian troops into Paris.

=== Third Carlist War ===
Some Spanish Papal Zouaves fought on the Catalan Front as the Carlist Zouaves (Spanish: Zuavos Carlistas), commanded by Alfonso de Borbón, the brother of the Carlist King Carlos VII, who asked him to enter the Catalan front, naming him General in Chief of the Zouaves. The Carlist Zouaves were also joined by many of the young aristocrats who previously fought side by side in Rome with the Infante Alfonso for the pontifical cause.

== Uniform ==
The Zouaves wore a similar style of uniform to that of the French Zouaves but in grey with red trim. A grey and red kepi was normally substituted for the North African fez, while a black busby with white plume was worn for parade dress.

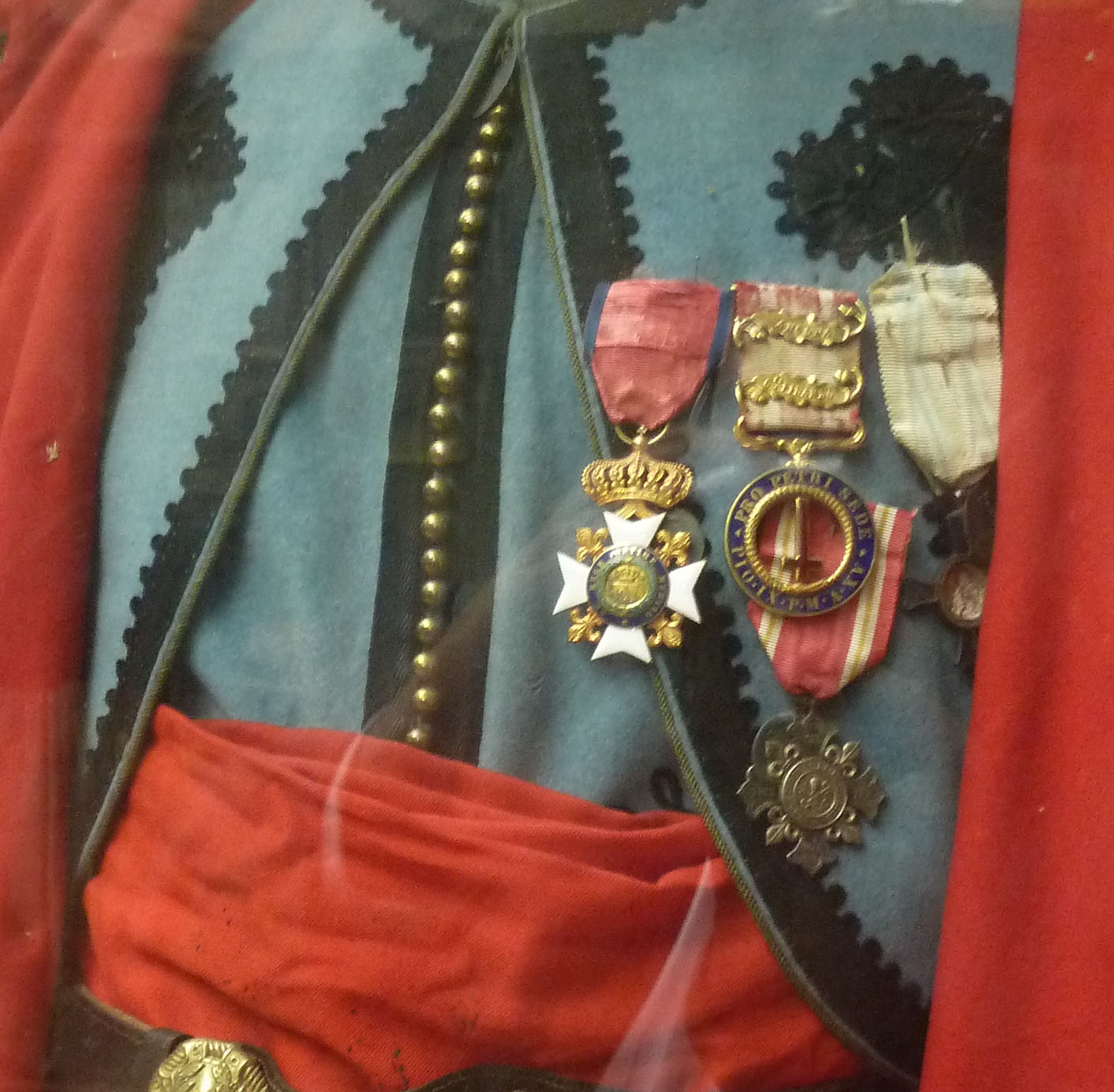
Medals of a Papal Zouave, blue original uniform in collections of the Royal Museum of the Armed Forces, Brussels

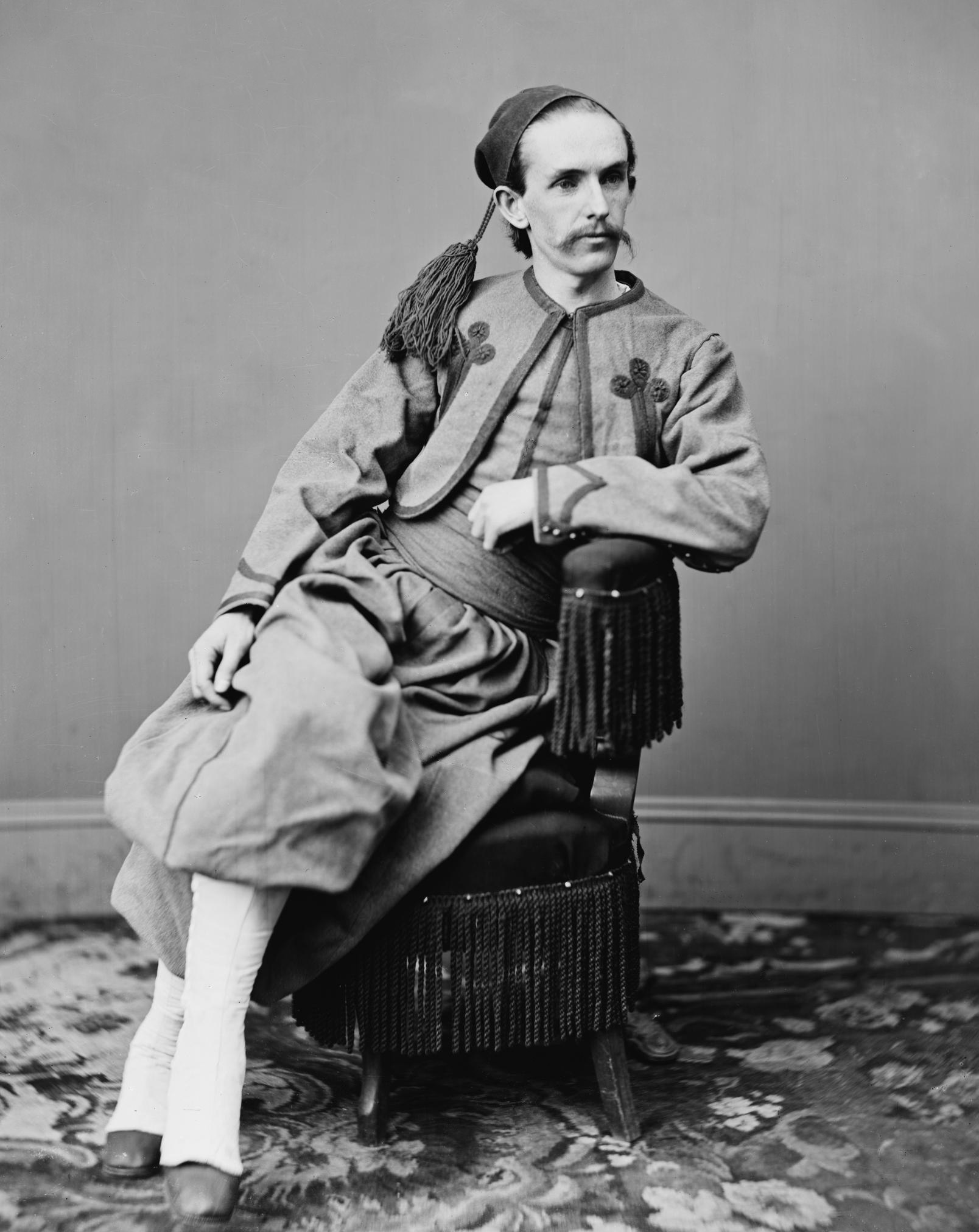
John Surratt in Papal Zouave uniform in Nantes, France, c. 1866–1867

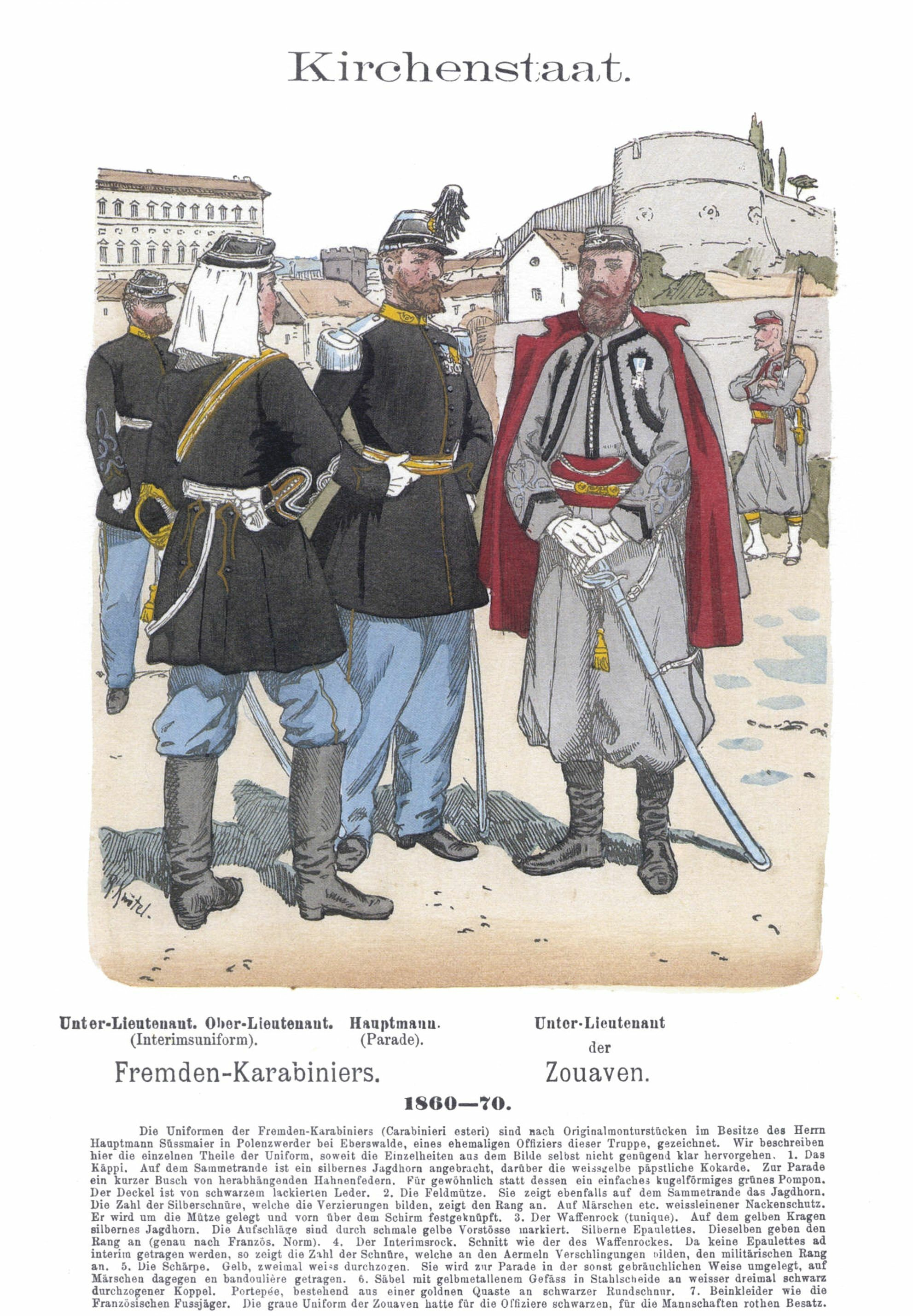
Papal Zouaves (individuals in grey)

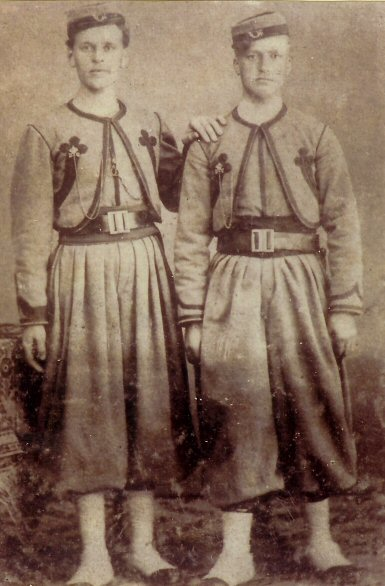
Douwe and Matthijs Walta from Workum, two Dutch Zouaves serving under Pope Pius IX in 1870

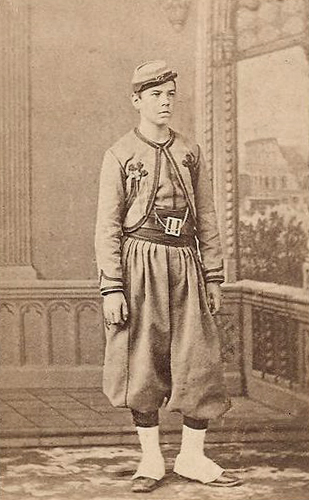
Jules Marie Deluen (1849–1918) in Papal Zouave uniform in Nantes, France

== Monuments and mementos ==
There are a number of monuments to the Papal Zouaves, including a Dutch museum near the Oudenbosch Basilica, the Mass chapel in Rome's Capuchin Crypt and a monument in the Lateran.

The names of the 507 Canadian Papal Zouaves are engraved in gold letters on marble slabs in Montreal’s Mary, Queen of the World. Also in Montreal, a miniature silver ship was hung from the ceiling of Our Lady of Succor chapel by Papal Zouaves as an ex-voto to thank the Virgin Mary after they escaped a shipwreck.

The Canadian Pontifical Zouaves Memorial Statue is located in Salaberry-de-Valleyfield, Quebec.

== In popular culture ==
=== Literature ===
The Zouaves are mentioned in Victor Hugo's poem Mentana.

=== Film ===
A bombing of the Zouave barracks at Palazzo Serristori, Rome, is the start of the 1977 film In the Name of the Pope King.

== See also ==
- Corps of Gendarmerie of Vatican City
- Military of Vatican City
- Pontifical Swiss Guard
- Swiss Guard
- John Surratt, fugitive son of executed Lincoln assassination conspirator Mary Surratt, who served in the Pontifical Zouaves

=== Former Pontifical Guard Corps ===
- Corsican Guard
- Noble Guard
- Palatine Guard

== Sources ==
=== Books ===
- Coulombe, Charles A. (2008). The Pope's Legion: The Multinational Fighting Force that Defended the Vatican. New York: Palgrave Macmillan. ISBN 9780230617568. Archived from the original on October 3, 2022.
- Powell, Joseph (1871). Two Years in the Pontifical Zouaves. London: R. Washbourne.
- Esposito, Gabriele (2018). Armies of the Italian Wars of Unification 1848-70. Vol. 2. Bloomsbury. ISBN 978-1-4728-2624-4.
- Esposito, Gabriele (2011). The Pope's Soldiers. A Military History of the Modern Vatican. University Press of Kansas. ISBN 978-0-7006-1770-8.
- Shann, Stephen (1991). French Army 1870-71 Franco-Prussian War. Men-at-Arms 237. Vol. (2) Republican Troops. Osprey Publishing. ISBN 978-1855321359.

=== Journals ===
- Villarrubia, Eleonore (December 23, 2008). "The Pope's Legion: The Multinational Fighting Force That Defended The Vatican". Catholicism.org.
