= Leonardo Ricci (geographer) =

Italian geographer (1877–1967)

- Born: 20 April 1877; Milan, Kingdom of Italy
- Died: 26 June 1967 (aged 90); Mantua, Italy
- Occupation(s): Geographer, cartographer

Leonardo Ricci (20 April 1877 – 26 June 1967) was an Italian geographer, cartographer, and professor of economic geography at the University Institute of Economics and Commerce in Venice (from 1928) and at Bocconi University in Milan. His work focused on limnology, glaciology, and, most notably, cartography. He contributed to the Atlante Geografico Zanichelli (1947), and was involved in the preparation of the maps for the Enciclopedia Italiana.
