= Florence Courthouse =

Judiciary building in Florence, Italy

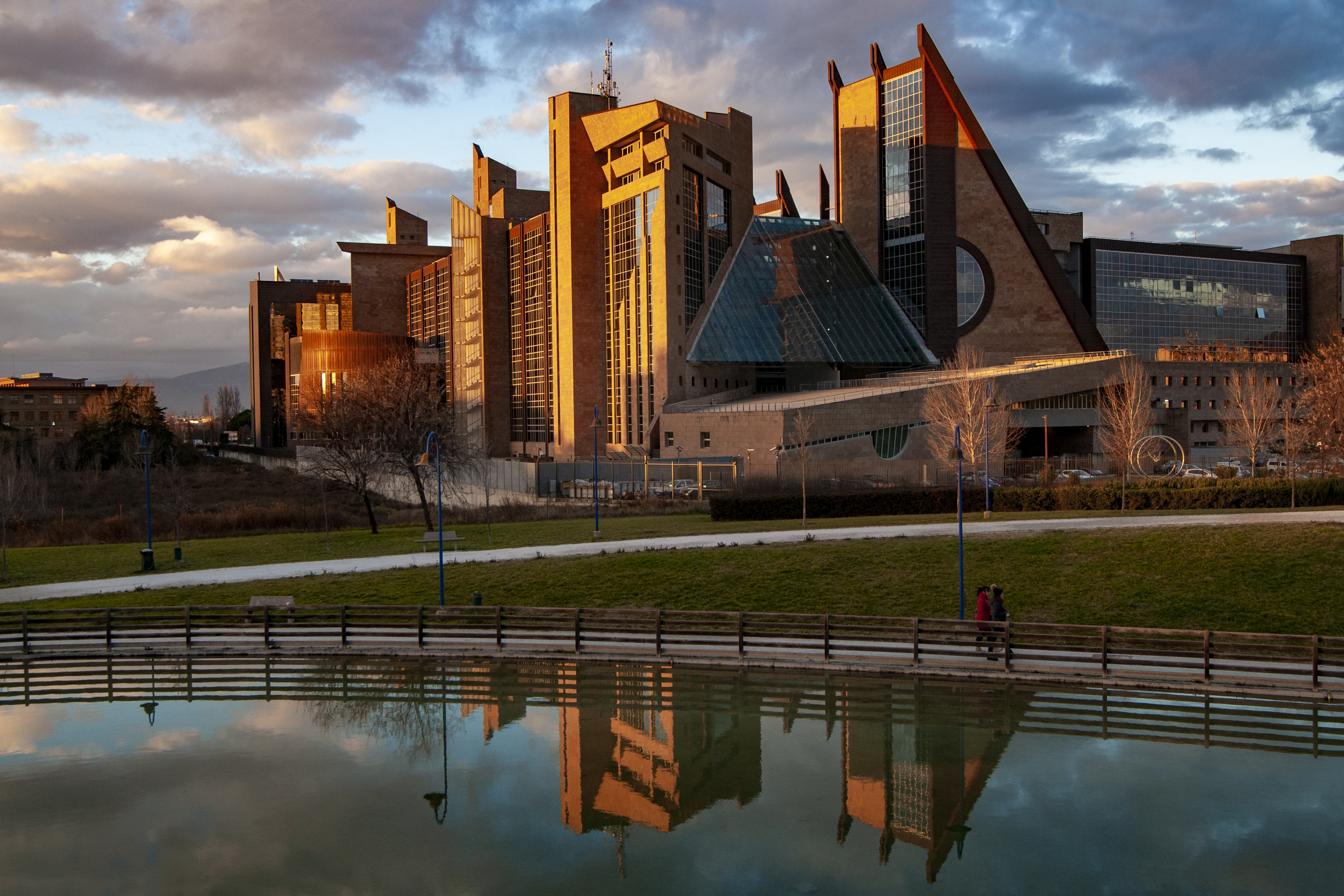
- Interactive map of the Florence Courthouse area

General information
- Status: Completed
- Location: Florence, Tuscany, Italy
- Coordinates: 43°47′43.59″N 11°13′33.12″E
- Construction started: 1999
- Opening: 23 January 2012; 14 years ago

Design and construction
- Architect: Leonardo Ricci

The Florence Courthouse (Italian: Palazzo di Giustizia di Firenze, lit. 'Florence Palace of Justice') is a large 21st-century complex on the Viale Guidoni in the Novoli quarter of Florence, Tuscany, Italy.

Situated near the entry of the A11 highway and the Florence Airport, it is Italy's second biggest tribunal building after that of Turin. It was designed by architect Leonardo Ricci.

== Bibliography ==
- Lambardi, Stefano (2012). Il Palazzo di Giustizia di Firenze. Materiali e cronache tra le visioni di Michelucci e il progetto di Ricci (PDF). Fiesole: Fondazione Giovanni Michelucci. ISBN 978-88-907780-3-2.
