= Novoli, Florence =

Novoli
- Neighbourhood
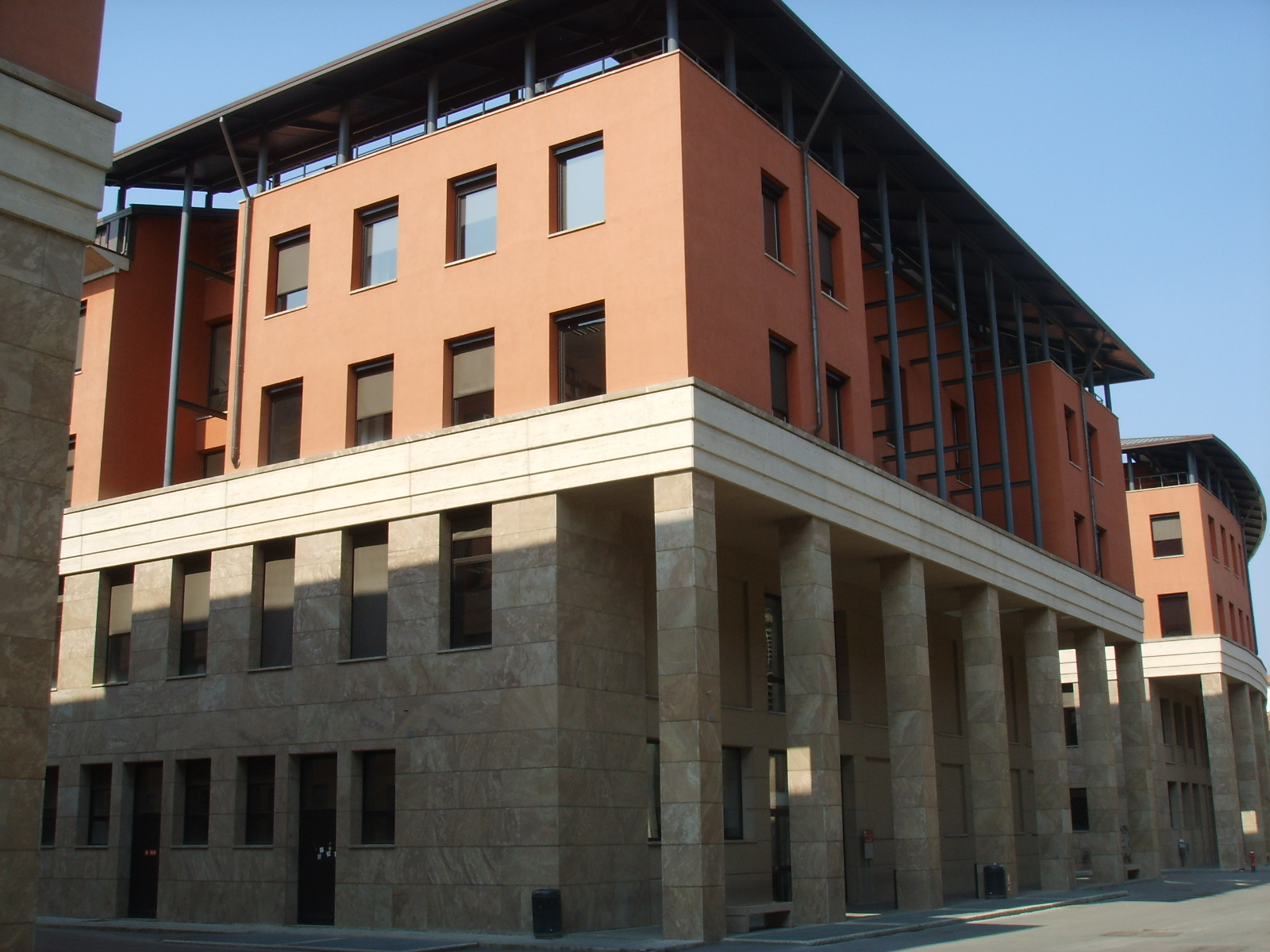
- University Faculty of Social Sciences in Novoli
- Interactive map of Novoli
- Coordinates: 43°47′31.2″N 11°13′48″E
- Country: Italy
- Region: Tuscany
- Metropolitan city: Florence
- Comune: Florence
- Quarter: 5 (Rifredi)
- Time zone: UTC+1 (CET)
  - Summer (DST): UTC+2 (CEST)

Novoli is a city quarter in the northwestern part of Florence, Italy. It was part of the former comune of Pellegrino until 1865, when it became a part of the comune of Florence.

== Modern history ==
Novoli was known primarily as an industrial area until the 1970s, when it started to develop as a "chaotic" and "dreary" residential neighbourhood.

Italian car manufacturer Fiat decided to close its factory in Novoli in the 1980s. The company agreed to donate land to the city of Florence, in return for permission to develop the rest of the area into a satellite town.

== Buildings ==
Notable buildings in Novoli include:

- the ruins of Villa San Donato
- the new Florence Courthouse, opened in 2012
- the Faculty of Social Sciences of the University of Florence
- Santa Maria a Novoli Church
- Donato in Polverosa Church
