= Leonardo Ricci (architect) =

Italian architect (1918–1994)

- Born: 8 June 1918; Rome, Kingdom of Italy
- Died: 29 September 1994 (aged 76); Venice, Italy
- Education: University of Florence
- Occupation: Architect

Signature
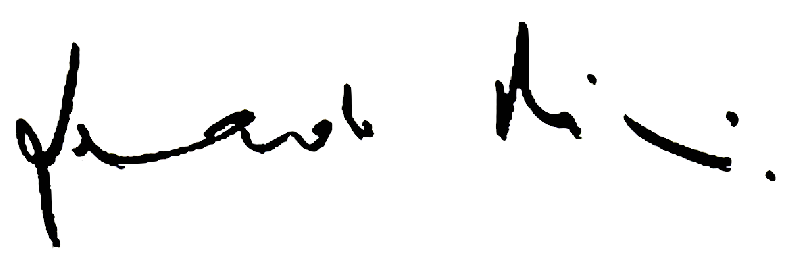

Leonardo Ricci (8 June 1918 – 29 September 1994) was an Italian architect.

== Life and career ==
Born on in Rome, he completed his classical studies in 1936 at the Liceo Michelangelo in Florence. He then enrolled in the Faculty of Architecture at the University of Florence, where he graduated in 1941. After being his student, Giovanni Michelucci hired him as his assistant. He worked at the Michelucci Studio until 1946. In addition to practicing as an architect, he also became a professor of architectural composition. He was awarded the gold medal at the Milan Triennial in 1957.

He was the father of scenographer Elena Ricci Poccetto and the grandfather of actress Elena Sofia Ricci.

== Works (selection) ==
- Agape Ecumenical Center, Prali (1946)
- Mercato dei Fiori (Flower Market), Pescia (1948–1951, with Emilio Brizzi, Enzo Gori, Giuseppe Giorgio Gori, and Leonardo Savioli)
- Gori Factory, Campi Bisenzio (1959–1962)
- Balmain House, Poggio (1959–1962)
- Monterinaldi Housing, Florence (1950–1968)
- Mann-Borgese House, Forte dei Marmi (1957–1958)
- Sorgane Housing, Florence (1957–1963)
- Monte degli Ulivi Housing, Riesi (1963–1966)
- Waldensian Church, Pachino (1964)
- Villa Baruffol, Portogruaro (1977–1980)
- Savona Courthouse, Savona (1987)
- Florence Courthouse, Florence (1988, built in 2012)
