= List of people from Zurich =

Many notable people were either born or adopted in the Swiss city of Zürich.

== Native people from Zürich ==
The following were born or adopted in Zürich.

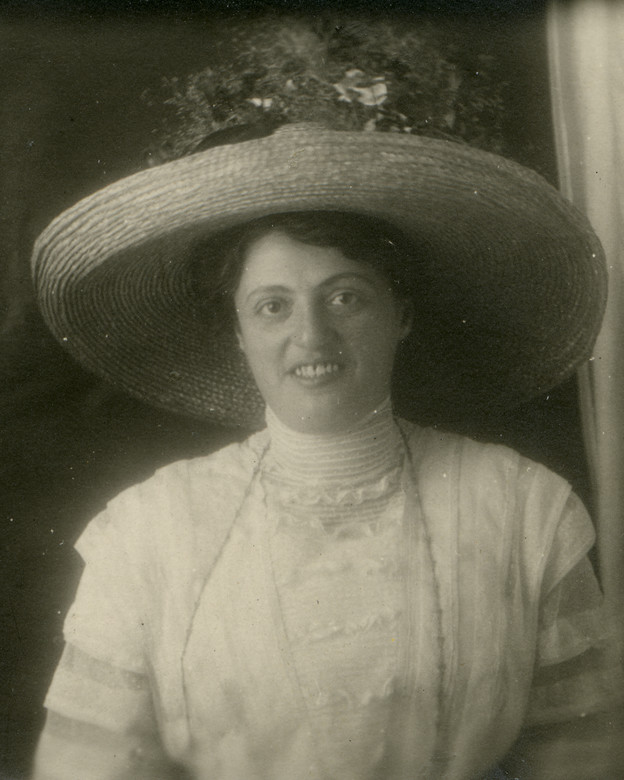
Rosa Bloch-Bollag

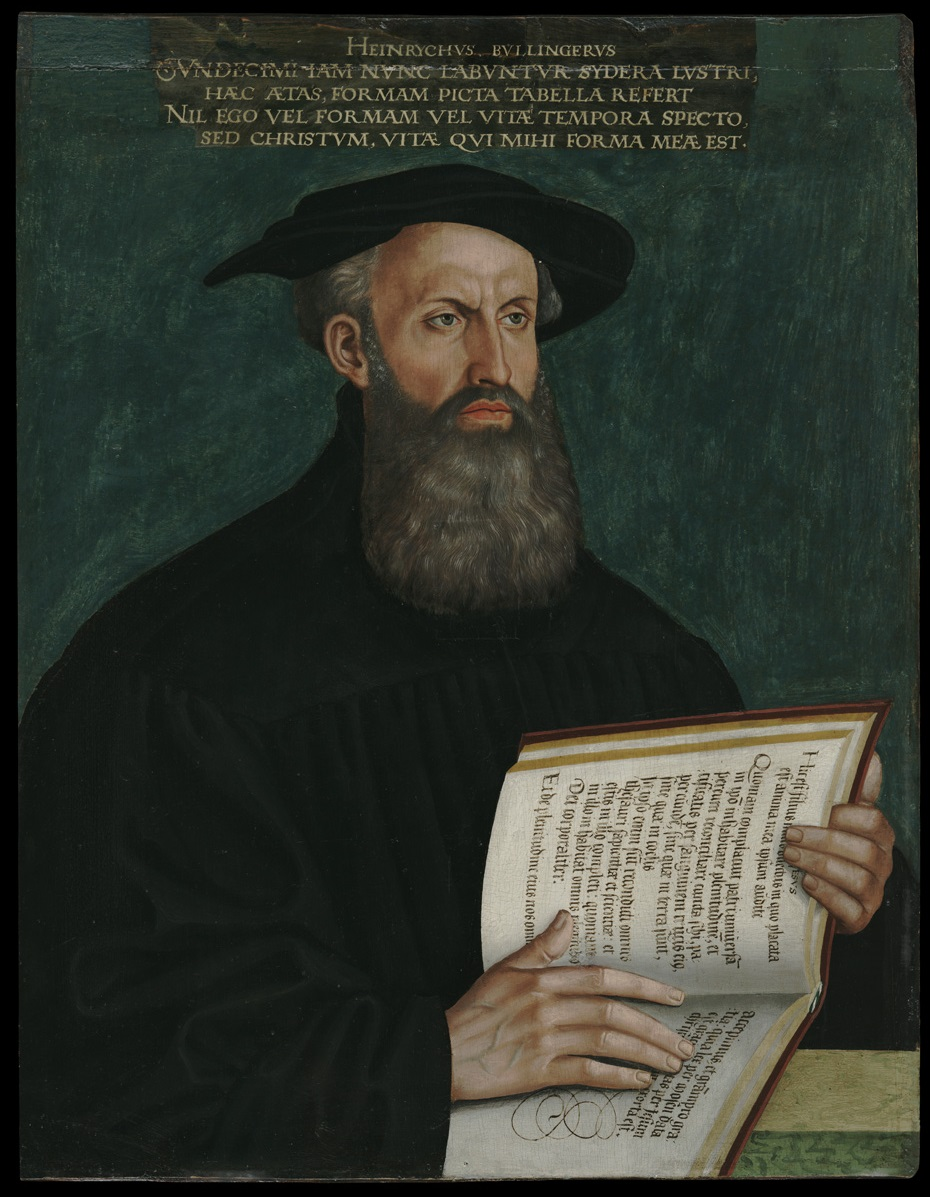
Heinrich Bullinger

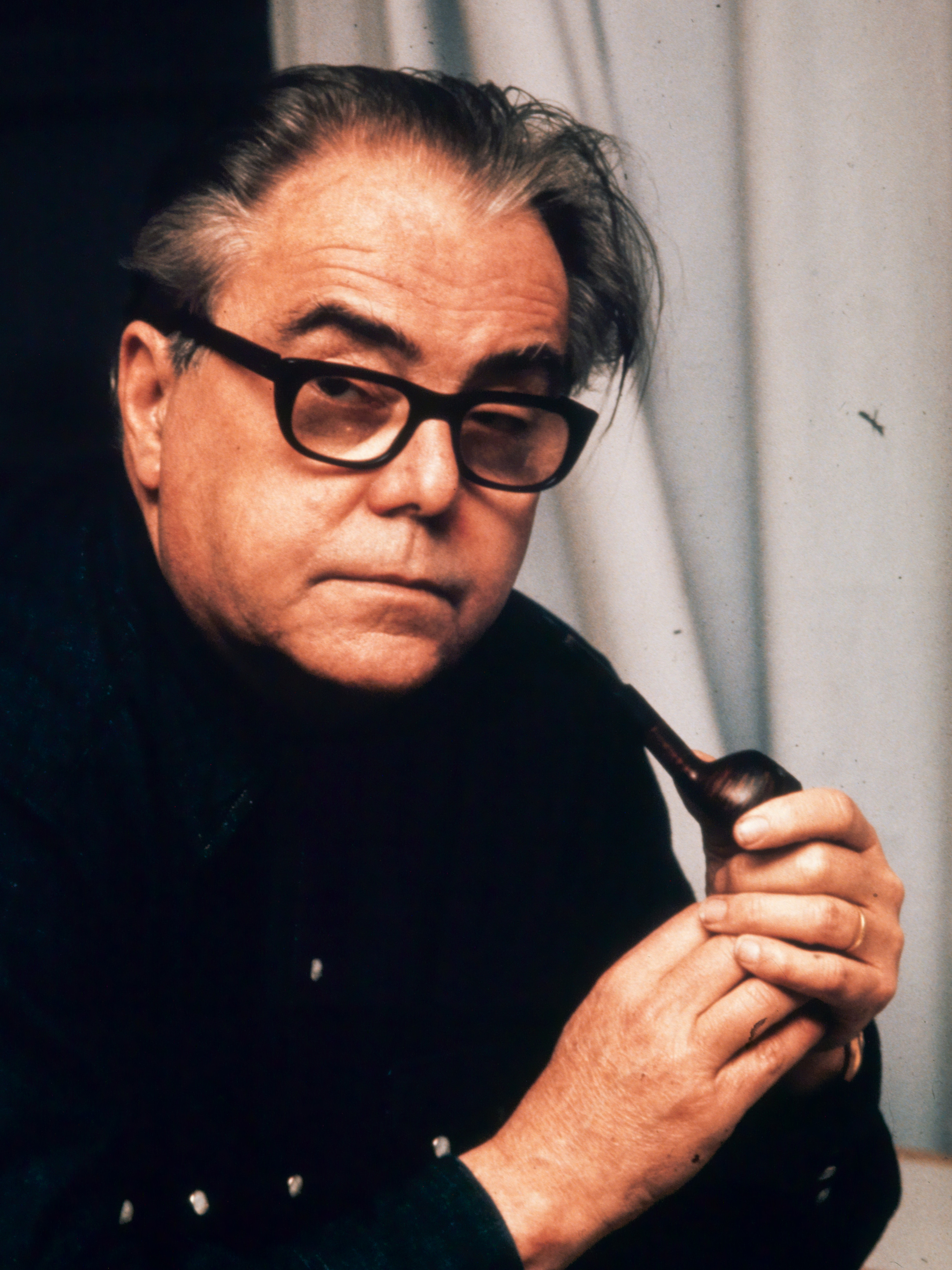
Max Frisch

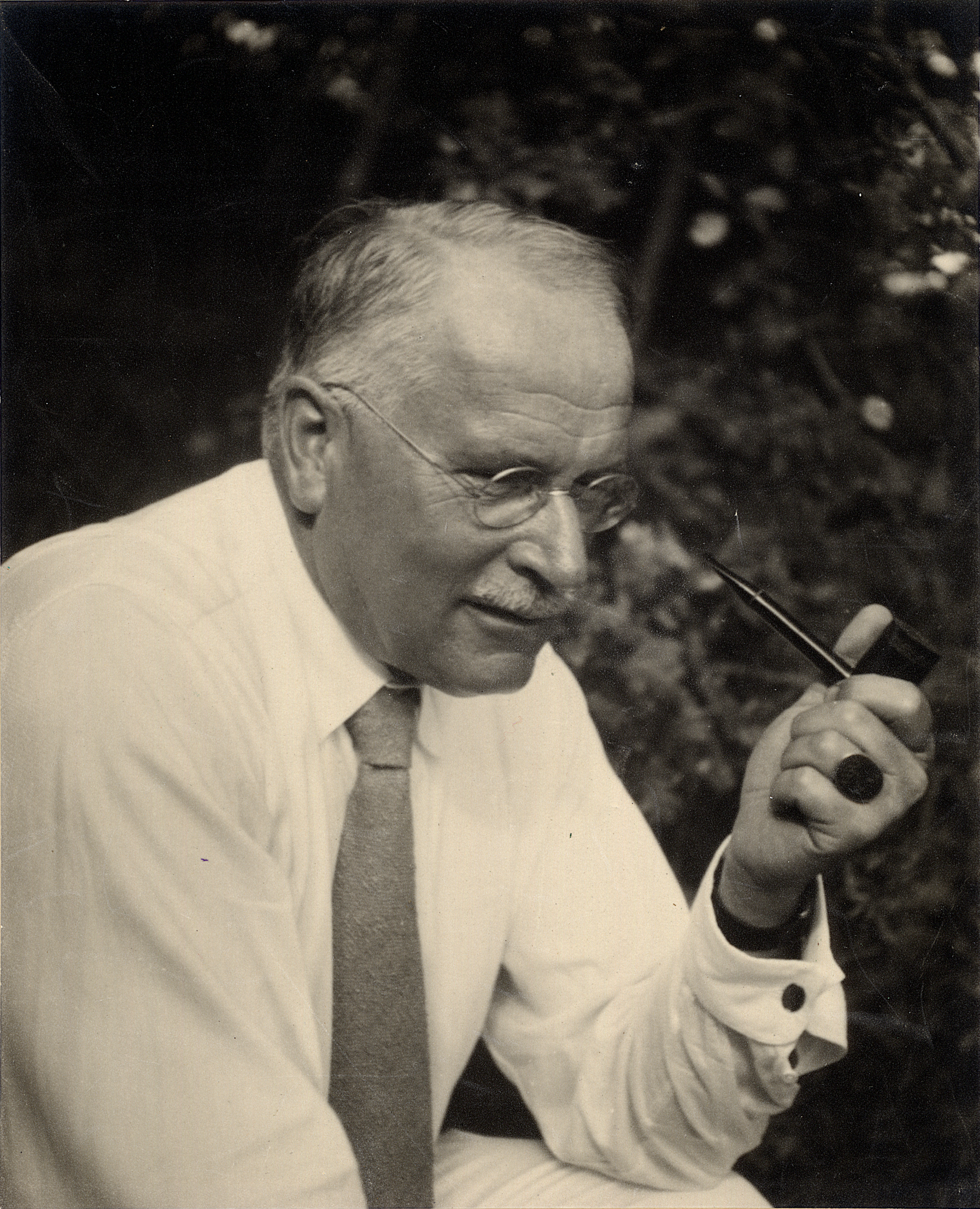
Carl Jung

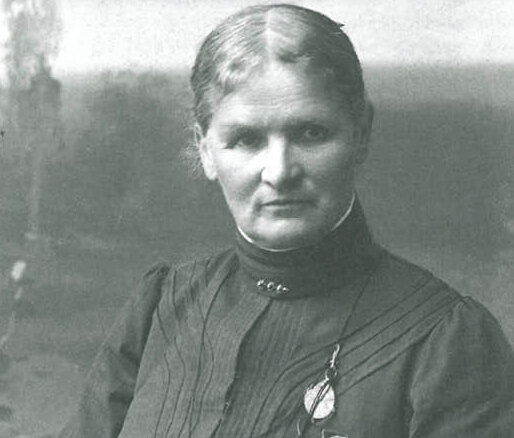
Susanna Orelli-Rinderknecht

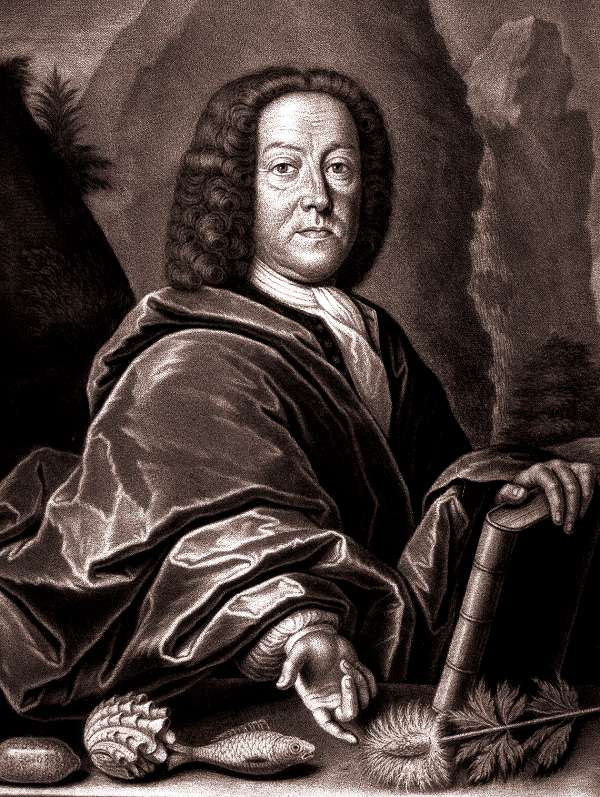
Johann Jakob Scheuchzer

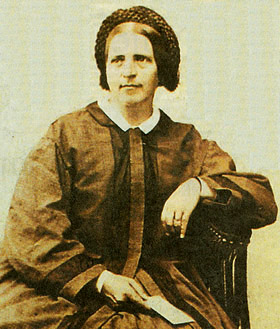
Johanna Spyri

=== A to D ===
- Mario Adorf (1930–2026), German actor and writer
- Jost Amman (1539–1591), Swiss-German artist
- Hans Asper (c. 1499–1571), Swiss painter
- Richard Avenarius (1843–1896), German-Swiss philosopher
- Hans J. Baer (1927–2011), Swiss banker
- Johann Georg Baiter (1801–1877), Swiss philologist and textual critic
- Daniel Barben (born 1961), Swiss professor
- Gianna Berger (born 1999), Swiss politician
- Denise Biellmann (born 1962), Swiss professional figure skater
- Diego Benaglio (born 1983), Swiss footballer
- Severin Blindenbacher (born 1983), Swiss ice hockey player
- Felix Bloch (1905–1983), Swiss-American physicist
- Rosa Bloch-Bollag (1880–1922), Swiss politician and activist
- Johann Kaspar Bluntschli (1808–1881), Swiss jurist and politician
- Johann Jakob Bodmer (1698–1783), Swiss author, academic, and poet
- Alain de Botton (born 1969), Swiss-born British author and public speaker
- Heinrich Bullinger (1504–1575), Swiss reformer and theologian
- René Burri (1933–2014), Swiss photographer
- Monika Dettwiler (born 1948), Swiss-Italian journalist and author
- Gottlieb Duttweiler (1888–1962), Swiss businessman and politician
- Ulla Dydo (1925–2017), Swiss writer

=== E to G ===
- Jeanne Eder-Schwyzer (1894–1957), Swiss women's rights activist
- Nico Elvedi (born 1996), Swiss footballer
- Alfred Escher (1819–1882), Swiss politician, business leader, and railways pioneer
- Lydia Escher (1858–1891), Swiss patron of the arts
- Arnold Escher von der Linth (1807–1872), Swiss geologist
- Mario Fehr (born 1958), politician
- Thomas Gabriel Fischer (born 1963), Swiss musician, painter, and author
- Peter Fischli (born 1952), Swiss artist
- Robert Frank (1924–2019), Swiss American photographer and documentary filmmaker
- Max Frisch (1911–1991), Swiss playwright and novelist
- Christoph Froschauer (c. 1490–1564), Swiss printer
- Henry Fuseli (1741–1825), Swiss painter, draughtsman, and writer on art
- Daniel Garbade (born 1957), Swiss Spanish artist
- Bruno Ganz (1941–2019), Swiss actor
- Ueli Gegenschatz (1971–2009), Swiss BASE jumper, paraglider, and skydiver
- Conrad Gessner (1516–1565), Swiss physician, naturalist, bibliographer, and philologist
- HR Giger (1940–2014), Swiss artist
- Marcel Grossmann (1878–1936), Swiss mathematician

=== H to K ===
- Tina Hausmann (born 2006), Swiss racing driver
- Markus Hediger (born 1959), Swiss writer and translator
- Albert Heim (1849–1937), Swiss geologist
- Max Holzmann (1899–1994), Swiss cardiologist
- Klara Honegger (1860–1940), Swiss suffragist and pacifist activist
- Johann Heinrich Hottinger (1620–1667), Swiss philologist and theologian
- Andy Hug (1964–2000), Swiss karateka and kickboxer
- Christine Hug (1980–2023), Swiss military officer
- Otto Frederick Hunziker (1873–1959), Swiss American dairy educator
- Hans-Ulrich Indermaur (born 1939), Swiss magazine editor, television reporter, and author
- Philippe Jordan (born 1974), Swiss conductor and pianist
- Leo Jud (1482–1542), Swiss reformer
- Carl Jung (1875–1961), Swiss psychiatrist, psychotherapist, and psychologist
- Gottfried Keller (1819–1890), Swiss poet
- Hugo Koblet (1925–1964), Swiss cyclist
- Ursula Koch (born 1941), Swiss politician
- Albert von Kölliker (1817–1905), Swiss anatomist, physiologist, and histologist
- Ernesto Korrodi (1870–1944), Swiss-born Portuguese architect

=== L to R ===
- Johann Kaspar Lavater (1741–1801), Swiss poet, writer, philosopher, physiognomist, and theologian
- Antonio Ligabue (1899–1965), Swiss-born Italian painter
- Hugo Loetscher (1929–2009), Swiss writer and essayist
- Rolf Lyssy (born 1936), Swiss screenwriter and film director
- Dieter Meier (born 1945), Swiss musician and conceptual artist
- Conrad Ferdinand Meyer (1825–1898), Swiss poet and historical novelist
- Ludwig Minelli (1932–2025), Swiss lawyer and euthanasia activist
- Silvio Moser (1941–1974), Swiss racing driver
- Walter Andreas Müller (born 1945), Swiss actor
- Harald Naegeli (born 1939), Swiss artist
- Heinz Nigg (born 1949), Swiss visual anthropologist, community artist, and video archivist
- Ernst Nobs (1886–1957), Swiss politician
- Hans Konrad von Orelli (1846–1912), Swiss theologian
- Johann Caspar von Orelli (1787–1849), Swiss classical scholar
- Susanna Orelli-Rinderknecht (1845–1939), Swiss temperance activist
- Johann Heinrich Pestalozzi (1746–1827), Swiss pedagogue and educational reformer
- Joachim Raff (1822–1882), German-Swiss composer and pianist

=== S to Z ===
- Sydney Schertenleib (born 2007), footballer for the Switzerland national team
- Johann Jakob Scheuchzer (1672–1733), Swiss physician and natural scientist
- Hanna Scheuring (born 1965), Swiss actress and theatre director
- Roland Scholl (1865–1945), Swiss chemist
- Trudi Schoop (1904–1999), Swiss dancer and therapist
- Peter Schweri (1939–2016), Swiss artist and musician
- Johanna Spyri (1827–1901), Swiss author
- Sandra Studer (born 1969), Swiss moderator and singer
- Stefi Talman (born 1958), Swiss shoe designer
- Bénédict Turrettini (1588–1631), Swiss pastor and professor of theology
- Pancho Vladigerov (1899–1978), Swiss-born Bulgarian composer, pedagogue, and pianist
- Heini Waser (1913–2008), Swiss painter
- Ernst Ulrich von Weizsäcker (born 1939), Swiss-born German politician and scientist
- Urs Widmer (1938–2014), Swiss novelist, playwright, and essayist
- Henry Wirz (1823-1865), Swiss-born Confederate States Army officer and war criminal
- Heidi Wunderli-Allenspach (born 1947), Swiss biologist

=== Famous residents ===
==== A to K ====
- Sibylle Berg (born 1962), German-Swiss contemporary author and essayist
- Max Bill (1908–1994), Swiss architect, artist and designer
- Anne-Marie Blanc (1919–2009), Swiss actress
- Boris Blank (born 1952), Swiss musician
- Georg Büchner (1813–1837), German dramatist
- Johann Gottfried Ebel (1764–1830), author of the first guidebook to Switzerland
- Albert Einstein (1879–1955), German-born theoretical physicist
- Stephanie Glaser (1920–2011), Swiss actress
- Hermann Greulich (1842–1925), Swiss politician
- Franz Hohler (born 1943), Swiss author and cabaret performer
- James Joyce (1915–1920), Irish author
- Udo Jürgens (1934–2014), Austrian composer and singer
- Patricia Kaas (born 1966), French singer and actress
- Jonas Kaufmann (born 1969), German-Austrian tenor opera singer
- Adolf Keller (1872–1963), Swiss Protestant theologian and writer
- Tina Keller-Jenny (1887–1985), Swiss physician and Jungian psychotherapist
- Erich Kleiber (1890–1956), Austrian Argentine conductor

==== L to Z ====
- Vladimir Lenin (1870–1924), Russian revolutionary, politician, and political theorist
- Moritz Leuenberger (born 1946), Swiss politician
- Rosa Luxemburg (1871–1919), German-Polish communist politician
- Mileva Marić (1875–1948), Serbian physicist and mathematician
- Lee "Scratch" Perry (1936–2021), Jamaican record producer, composer, and singer
- Elisabeth von Rapperswil (c. 1251–1309), countess of Grafschaft Rapperswil
- Manuel Rivera-Ortiz (born 1968), Puerto Rican photographer
- Roger Sablonier (1941–2010), Swiss historian and writer
- Ernst Sieber (1927–2018), Swiss pastor, social activist and politician
- Kurt Tucholsky (1890–1935), German journalist, satirist, and writer
- Tina Turner (1939–2023), American singer-songwriter and actress
- Tristan Tzara (1896–1963), Romanian avant-garde poet, essayist, and performance artist
- Georg von Vollmar (1850–1922), Bavarian politician
- Richard Wagner (1813–1883), German composer and conductor
- Raphael Zuber (born 1973), Swiss architect

== See also ==
- List of mayors of Zürich
