= Sack of Rome (1527) =

Habsburg siege and subsequent sack of Papal Rome

Coordinates: 41°50′N 12°30′E

- Part of the War of the League of Cognac
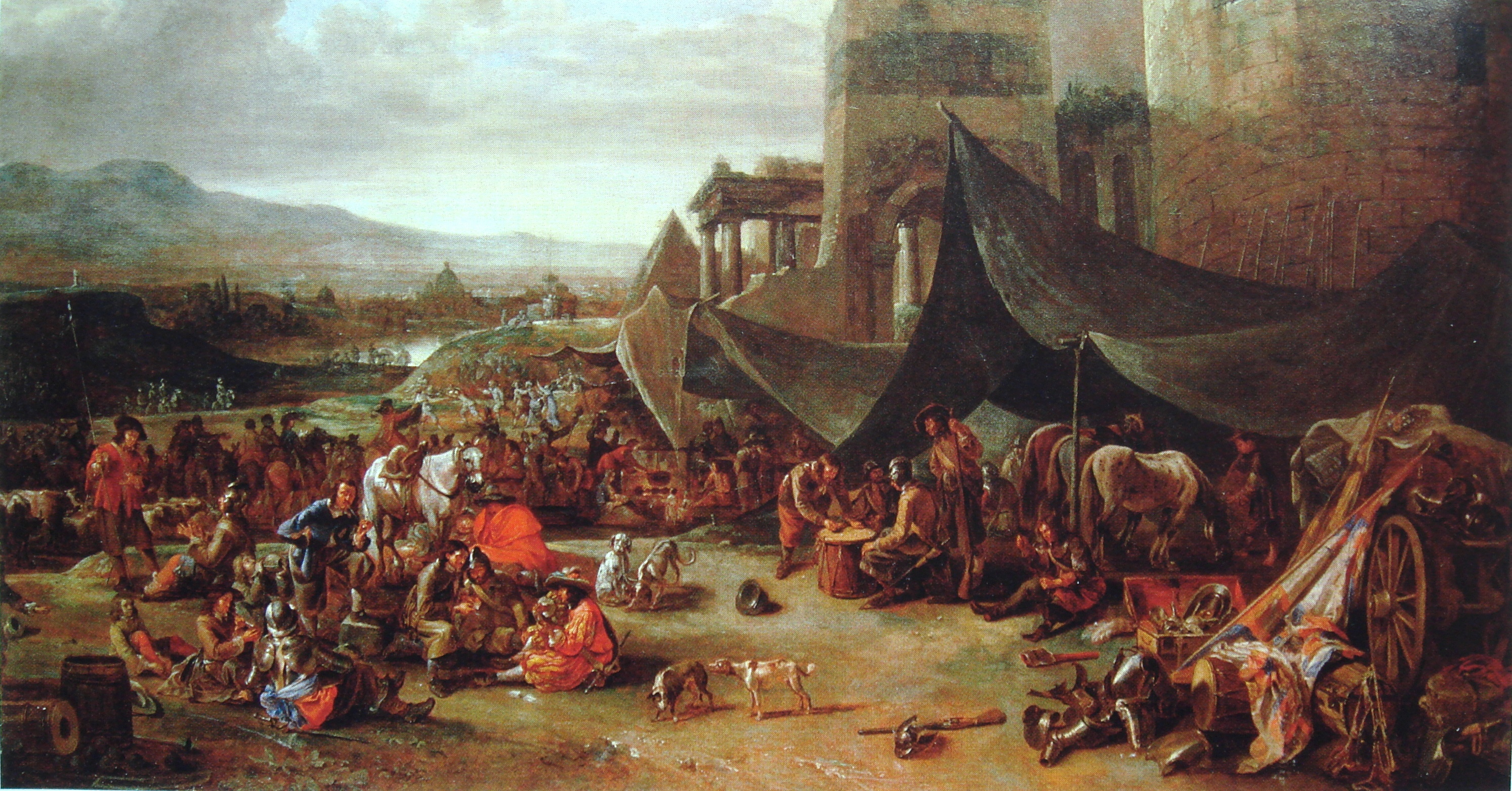
- The sack of Rome in 1527, by Johannes Lingelbach, 17th century (private collection)
Date	6 May 1527; 499 years ago
Location	Rome, Papal States
Result	see § Aftermath and effects

Belligerents
Papal States	(Holy Roman Empire) (Habsburg Spain) Imperial army (mutinous) (Note: Both the Holy Roman Empire and Spain were under one single personal union to Emperor Charles V.)

Commanders and leaders
Pope Clement VII (POW); Caspar Röist †; Renzo da Ceri; Michele Antonio	Charles de Bourbon †; Philibert of Châlon (WIA); Ferrante Gonzaga

Strength
5,000 militiamen; 189 Swiss Guards	20,000+ (mutinous): 14,000 German Landsknechte; 6,000 Spanish soldiers; Unclear number of Italian mercenaries

Casualties and losses
1,000 militiamen killed 147 Swiss Guards killed	Unknown
- 45,000 civilians dead, wounded, or exiled

The Sack of Rome, then part of the Papal States, followed the capture of Rome on 6 May 1527 by the mutinous troops of Charles V, Holy Roman Emperor, during the War of the League of Cognac. Charles V only intended to threaten military action to make Pope Clement VII accept his terms. However, the Imperial army (14,000 Germans, including Lutherans, 6,000 Spaniards and some Italians) were largely unpaid and mutinied. Despite being ordered not to storm Rome, they broke into the scarcely defended city and began looting, killing, and holding citizens for ransom without any restraint. Clement VII took refuge in Castel Sant'Angelo after the Swiss Guard were annihilated in a delaying rear guard action; he remained there until a ransom was paid to the pillagers.

Benvenuto Cellini, eyewitness to the events, described the sack in his works. It was not until February 1528 that the spread of a plague and the approach of the League forces under Marshal of France Odet de Foix forced the army to withdraw towards Naples. Rome's population had dropped from 55,000 to 10,000 due to the atrocities, famine, an outbreak of plague, and flight from the city. The subsequent loss of the League army during the Siege of Naples secured a victory in the War of the League of Cognac for Charles V. The Emperor denied responsibility for the sack and came to terms again with Clement VII. On the other hand, the Sack of Rome further exacerbated religious hatred and antagonism between Catholics and Lutherans.

== Preceding events ==
The growing power of the King of Spain and Holy Roman Emperor Charles V alarmed Pope Clement VII, who perceived Charles as a threat to the papal power. Clement VII formed an alliance with Charles V's arch-enemy, King Francis I of France, which came to be known as the League of Cognac.

The League also included the Duchy of Milan, the Republic of Venice, the Republic of Genoa, and the Florence of the Medici. The League began hostilities in 1526 by attacking the Republic of Siena, but the undertaking proved to be a failure and revealed the weakness of the troops at the Pope's disposal.

The Imperial Army defeated the French army, but funds were not available to pay the soldiers. The 34,000 Imperial troops mutinied and forced their commander, Duke Charles III of Bourbon, to lead them towards Rome, which was an easy target for pillaging due to the unstable political landscape at the time.

Aside from some 6,000 Spaniards under the Duke of Bourbon, the army included some 14,000 Landsknechte under Georg von Frundsberg; some Italian infantry led by Fabrizio Maramaldo, the powerful Italian cardinal Pompeo Colonna, and Luigi Gonzaga; and some cavalry under the command of Ferdinando Gonzaga and Philibert, Prince of Orange. Though Martin Luther himself was against attacking Rome and Pope Clement VII, some followers of Luther's Protestant movement viewed the papal capital as a target for religious reasons. Numerous outlaws, along with the League's deserters, joined the army during its march.

The Duke of Bourbon left Arezzo on 20 April 1527, taking advantage of chaos among the Venetians and their allies after a revolt broke out in Florence against Pope Clement VII's family, the Medici. In a message to Clement, the Duke announced that "he [wouldn’t] be able to hinder his army [from marching to Rome], being dragged along with it more like a prisoner than a free man"; however, contemporary eyewitnesses and historians doubted his claim of helplessness. His largely undisciplined troops sacked Acquapendente and San Lorenzo alle Grotte, and then occupied Viterbo and Ronciglione, reaching the walls of Rome on 5 May.

== Sack ==
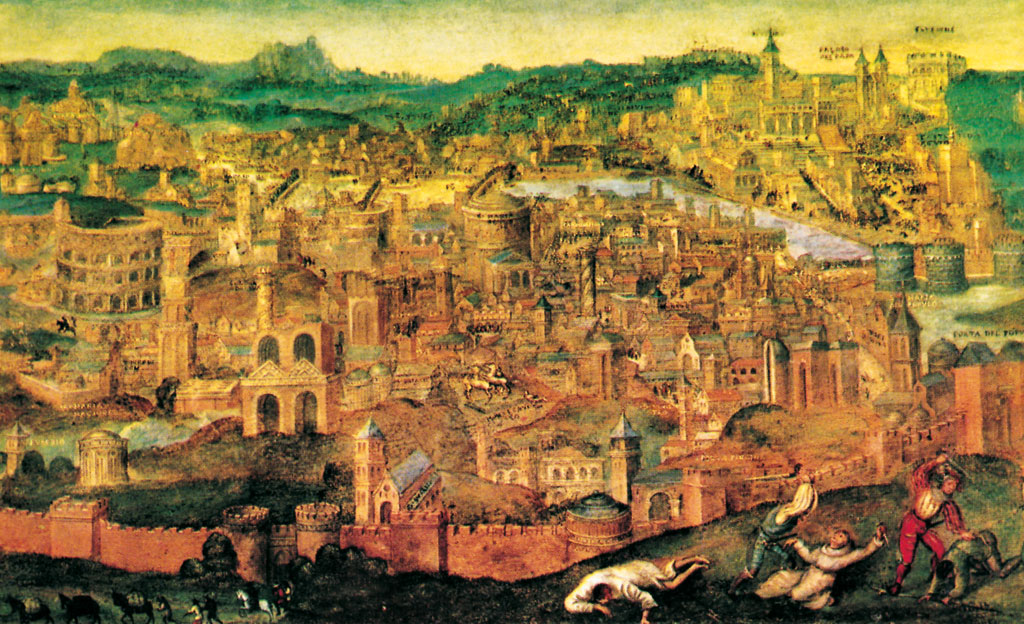
Sack of Rome. By Pieter Bruegel the Elder.

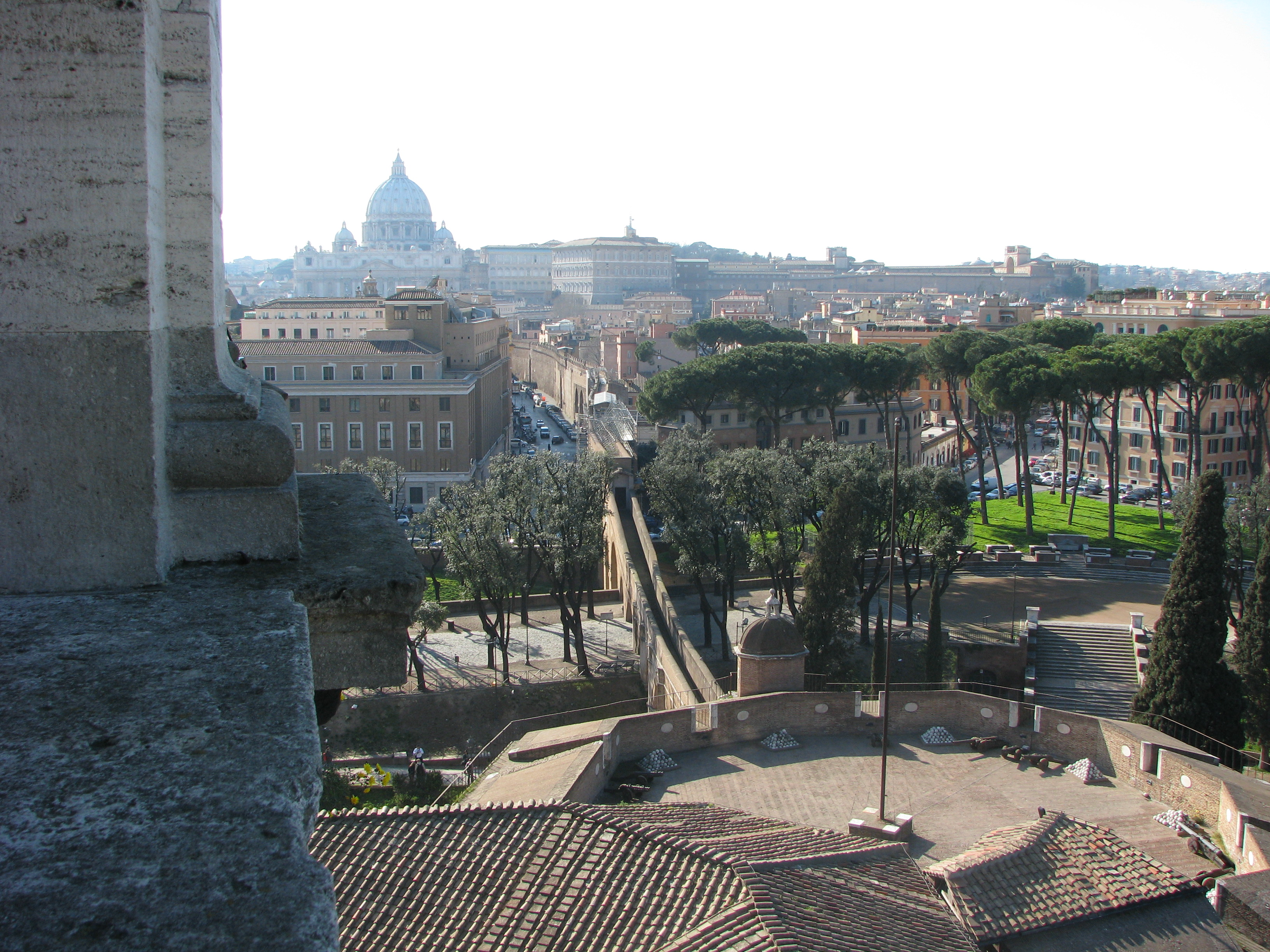
View of the Passetto di Borgo from Castel Sant'Angelo. St Peter's Basilica and the Vatican pictured in the background.

The imperial troops were 14,000 Germans, 6,000 Spaniards, and an uncertain number of Italian infantry. The troops defending Rome were much fewer: only 5,000 militiamen led by Renzo da Ceri and 189 Papal Swiss Guards. The city's defenses included the massive Aurelian Walls, and substantial artillery, which the Imperial army lacked. Charles of Bourbon needed to conquer the city swiftly to avoid the risk of being trapped between the besieged city and the League's army.

On 6 May, the Imperial army attacked the walls at the Gianicolo and Vatican hills. The Duke of Bourbon was fatally wounded in the assault. He was allegedly shot by Benvenuto Cellini, a prominent artist who participated in Rome's defense, killing the Duke and wounding Philibert of Châlon according to his own account. The Duke was wearing his famous white cloak to mark him out to his troops, which also had the unintended consequence of pointing him out as the leader to his enemies. With the death of their last respected leader, the common soldiery in the Imperial army lost any restraint when they easily succeeded in storming the walls of Rome the same day. Philibert of Châlon took command of the troops, but he was not as popular or feared, leaving him with little authority.

In the event known as the Stand of the Swiss Guard, the Swiss, alongside the garrison's remaining soldiers, made their last stand in the Teutonic Cemetery within the Vatican. Their captain, Kaspar Röist, was wounded and later sought refuge in his house, where Spanish soldiers killed him in front of his wife. The Swiss fought bitterly, but were hopelessly outnumbered and almost annihilated. Some survivors, accompanied by a band of refugees, fell back to the steps of St. Peter's Basilica. Those who went toward the Basilica were massacred, and only 42 survived. This group of 42, under the command of Hercules Goldli, managed to stave off the Habsburg troops pursuing the Pope's entourage as it made its way across the Passetto di Borgo, a secure elevated passage that connects the Vatican City to Castel Sant'Angelo.

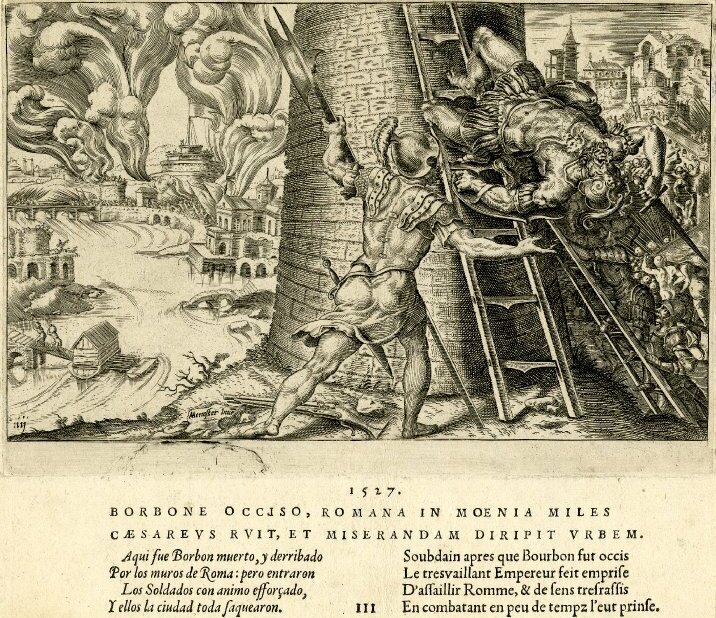
Sack of Rome. 6 May 1527. By Martin van Heemskerck (1527).

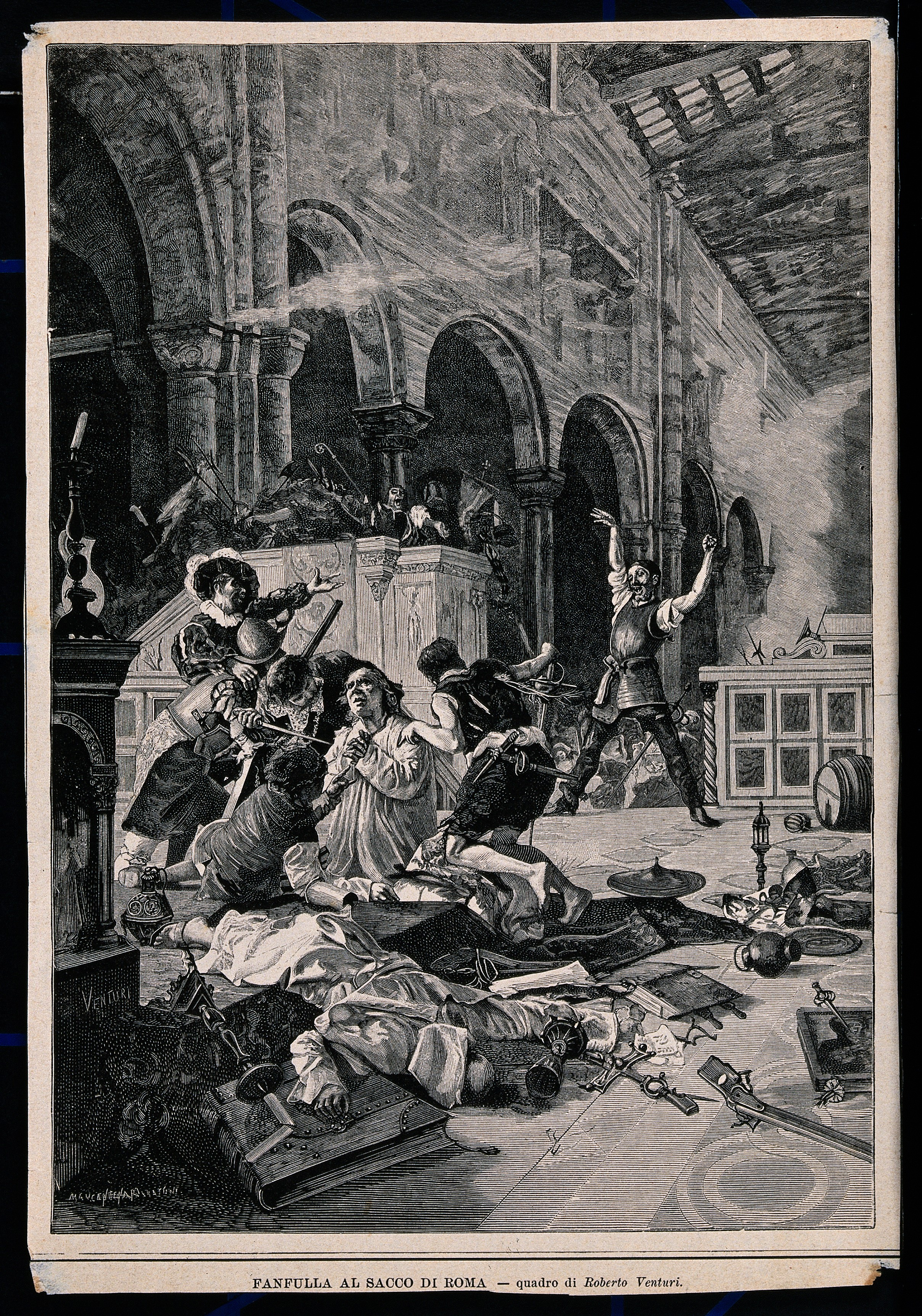
A massacre in the church during the Sack of Rome. Wood engraving by Robert Venturi

After the execution of some 1,000 defenders of the Papal capital and shrines, the pillage began. Churches and monasteries, as well as the palaces of prelates and cardinals, were looted and destroyed. Even pro-Imperial cardinals had to pay to save their properties from the rampaging soldiers as they marauded without regard to the allegiance of their victims. Citizens of Rome of all descriptions were subjected to the carnage – women were raped, hospice patients killed, and many prominent allies of the Imperial cause were not spared. Particular vehemence was displayed by the German Landsknechte, many of whom were Lutheran, towards the Catholic holy sites. Churches were ransacked, relics profaned, and sacred images destroyed. Parodies of Catholic rites were carried out; for example, a prostitute was dressed in priestly vestments and seated on the Chair of Saint Peter to the cry of "Vivat Lutherus pontifex!", and animals were mockingly presented for communion. Violence towards clergy was pointed, with monks being castrated and nuns raped, along with a general targeting of priests for killing. Although Martin Luther himself was against revolt against the Church by "hand and flail," the actions of German troops were ostensibly fuelled by the religious discontent proliferating at the time, and the targeting of Church officials and property was intentionally symbolic. However, most of the pillaging was a means for the troops to compensate themselves monetarily. To that end, prisoners were taken to be held for ransom, with more prominent prisoners making for more profitable ransoms. On 8 May, Cardinal Pompeo Colonna, a personal enemy of Clement VII, entered the city. He was followed by peasants from his fiefs, who had come to avenge the sacks they had suffered at the hands of the Papal armies. Colonna was touched by the pitiful conditions in the city and gave refuge to some Roman citizens in his palace. Colonna attempted to bring some sense of order to the events, and the troops began only gradually to cease pillaging in response to his orders.

The Vatican Library was saved because Philibert had set up his headquarters there. After three days of ravages, Philibert ordered the soldiers to stop pillaging, but few heeded his words, and the plundering continued unabated for five more days. In the meantime, Clement remained a prisoner in Castel Sant'Angelo. Francesco Maria I della Rovere and Michele Antonio of Saluzzo arrived with troops on 1 June in Monterosi, north of the city. Their cautious behaviour prevented them from obtaining an easy victory against the now totally undisciplined imperial troops. On 6 June, Clement VII surrendered, and agreed to pay a ransom of 400,000 ducati in exchange for his life; conditions included the cession of Parma, Piacenza, Civitavecchia, and Modena to the Holy Roman Empire (however, only the last would actually change hands). At the same time Venice took advantage of this situation to conquer Cervia and Ravenna, while Sigismondo Malatesta returned to Rimini. Despite the signing of this treaty, pillaging continued for several more months.

In the aftermath of the Sack of Rome, violence spread into the surrounding regions as imperial troops extended their depredations into Umbria. In July 1527, the Landsknechte sacked Narni and reportedly Terni soon after, while also devastating the countryside and terrorizing areas around Orte.

== Aftermath and effects ==
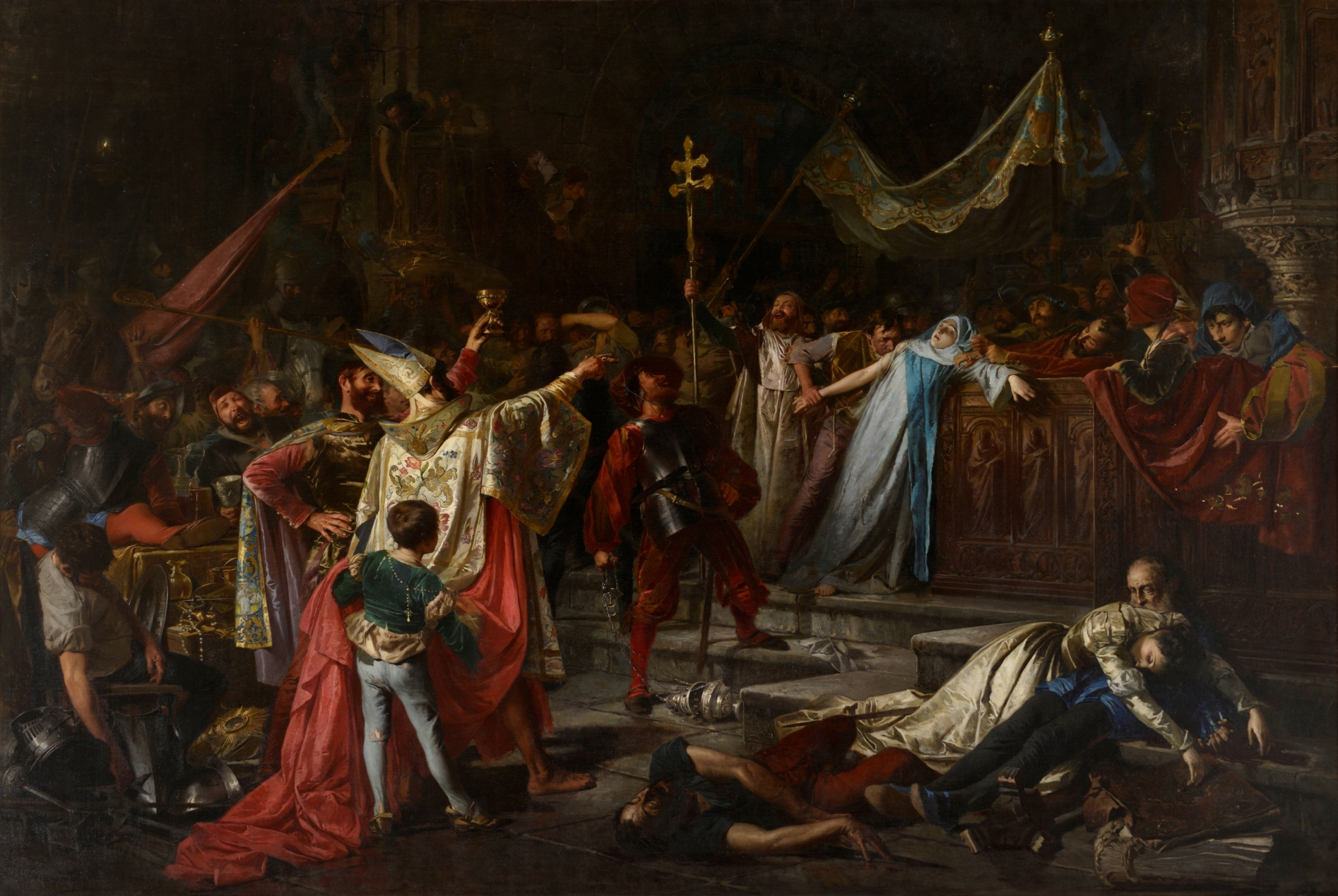
Sack of Rome, by Francisco Javier Amérigo, 1884. Biblioteca Museu Víctor Balaguer

Often cited as the end of the Italian High Renaissance, the Sack of Rome shaped the histories of Europe, Italy, and Christianity, with lasting ripples throughout European culture and politics.

Before the sack, Pope Clement VII opposed the ambitions of Emperor Charles V. Afterward, he lacked the military or financial resources to do so. To avert more warfare, Clement adopted a conciliatory policy toward Charles.

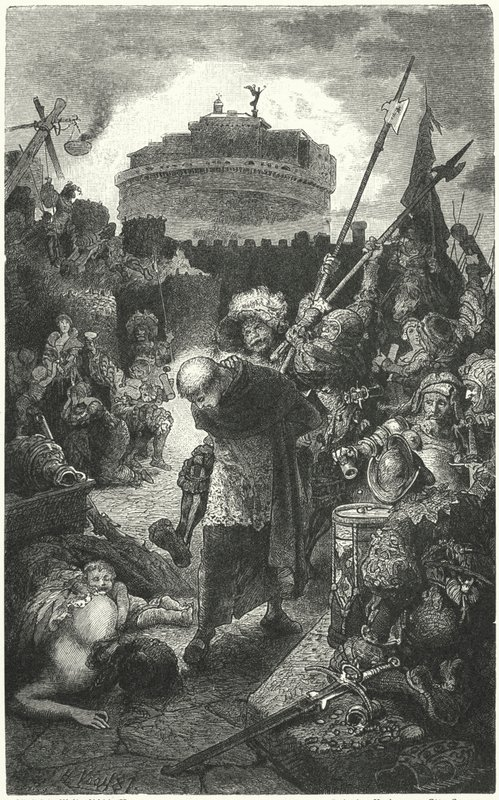
German Landsknechts looting Rome in 1527, Hermann Vogel 1880

The sack had major repercussions for Italian society and culture, and in particular, for Rome. Clement's War of the League of Cognac would be the last fight of some of the Italian city-states for independence until the nineteenth century. Before the sack, Rome had been a center of Italian High Renaissance culture and patronage, and the main destination for any European artist eager for fame and wealth, thanks to the prestigious commissions of the papal court. In the sack, Rome suffered depopulation and economic collapse, sending artists and writers elsewhere. Lamenting the loot and destruction of many of Rome's antiquities and artistic treasures, Antonio Tabaldeo wrote, "if you come back, you will find Rome unmade." The calamity also dealt a grave blow to Rome's scholarly prestige, as the contents of many of its great libraries – including the Vatican library – were destroyed or sold in the sack. Proponents of humanism especially lamented the destruction of the city's stores of knowledge, which had come to characterize Rome as a "paradise of learning"; the sack did indeed prove to mark the end of humanism's favor within Christian thought. The city's population dropped from over 55,000 before the attack to 10,000 afterward. An estimated 6,000 to 12,000 people were murdered; it is said that two thousand bodies were disposed of in the Tiber River. Among those who died in the sack were papal secretary Paolo Valdabarini and professor of natural history Augusto Valdo.

Many Imperial soldiers also died in the aftermath, largely from diseases caused by masses of unburied corpses in the streets. Pillaging finally ended in February 1528, eight months after the initial attack, when the city's food supply ran out, there was no one left to ransom, and plague appeared. Clement would continue artistic patronage and building projects in Rome, but a perceived Medicean golden age had passed, with the sack having brought about "the end of the Rome of Julius II and Leo X." The city did not recover its population losses until around 1560.

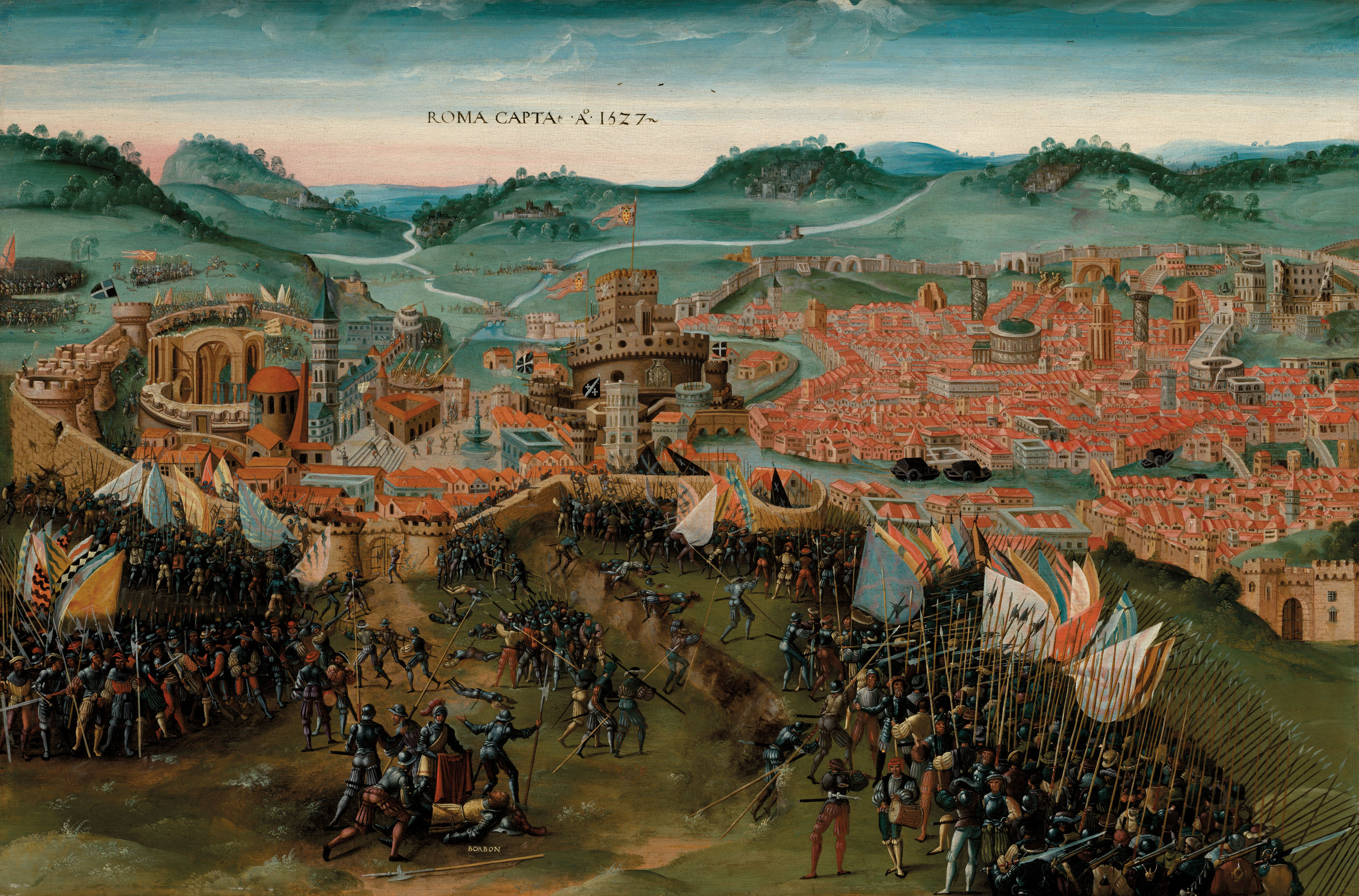
Sack of Rome, Flemish school, 16th century

A power shift – away from the Pope, toward the Emperor – also produced lasting consequences for Catholicism. After learning of the sack, Emperor Charles professed great embarrassment that his troops had imprisoned Pope Clement. Charles would eventually restore many of the spoils of the sack, amounting in value to more than 4 million ducati, to the Vatican. However, though he had wanted to avoid destruction within the city of Rome, which would damage his reputation, he had ordered troops to Italy to bring Clement under his control. Charles eventually came to terms with the Pope with the Treaty of Barcelona (1529) and the coronation of Bologna. This done, Charles molded the Church in his own image. Clement, never again to directly oppose the Emperor, rubber-stamped Charles' demands – among them naming cardinals nominated by the latter; crowning Charles Holy Roman Emperor and King of Italy at Bologna in 1530; and refusing to annul the marriage of Charles' beloved aunt, Catherine of Aragon, to King Henry VIII of England, prompting the English Reformation. Cumulatively, these actions changed the complexion of the Catholic Church, steering it away from Renaissance freethought personified by the Medici Popes, toward the religious orthodoxy exemplified by the Counter-Reformation. After Clement's death in 1534, under the influence of Charles and later his son King Philip II of Spain (1556–1598), the Inquisition became pervasive, and the humanism encouraged by Renaissance culture came to be viewed as contrary to the teachings of the Church.

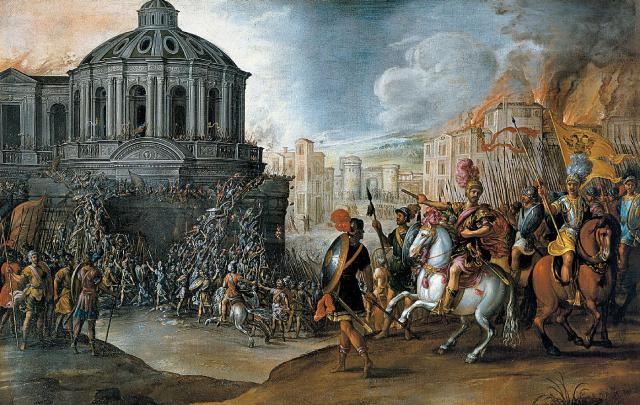
Sack of Rome, 17th century painting

The sack also helped make permanent the split between Catholics and Protestants. Previously, Charles and Clement had disagreed over how to address Martin Luther and the Protestant Reformation, which was spreading throughout Germany. Charles advocated for calling a Church Council to settle the matter. Clement opposed this, believing that monarchs should not dictate Church policy; and also fearing a revival of conciliarism, which had exacerbated the Western Schism during the 14th–15th centuries, and deposed numerous Popes. Clement advocated a Holy War to unite Christendom. Charles opposed this because his armies and treasury were occupied in fighting other wars. After the sack, Clement acceded to Charles' wishes, agreeing to call a Church Council and naming the city of Trent, Italy, as its site. He did not convene the Council of Trent during his lifetime, fearing that the event would be a dangerous power play. In 1545, eleven years after Clement's death, his successor Pope Paul III convened the Council of Trent. As Charles predicted, it reformed the corruption present in certain orders of the Catholic Church. However, by 1545, the moment for reconciliation between Catholics and Protestants – arguably a possibility during the 1520s, given cooperation between the Pope and Emperor – had passed. In assessing the effects of the Sack of Rome, Martin Luther commented: "Christ reigns in such a way that the Emperor who persecutes Luther for the Pope is forced to destroy the Pope for Luther" (LW 49:169).

In commemoration of the Swiss Guard's bravery in defending Pope Clement VII during the Sack of Rome, recruits to the Swiss Guard are sworn in on 6 May every year.

== In popular culture ==
The last part of the historical fiction novel The Adventurer by Finnish author Mika Waltari describes the Sack of Rome through the eyes of a young man drifting through historical events across 16th-century Europe.

The Sack of Rome is the main background of the song The Last Stand by Sabaton.
