= Peter Marvey =

Swiss illusionist (born 1971)

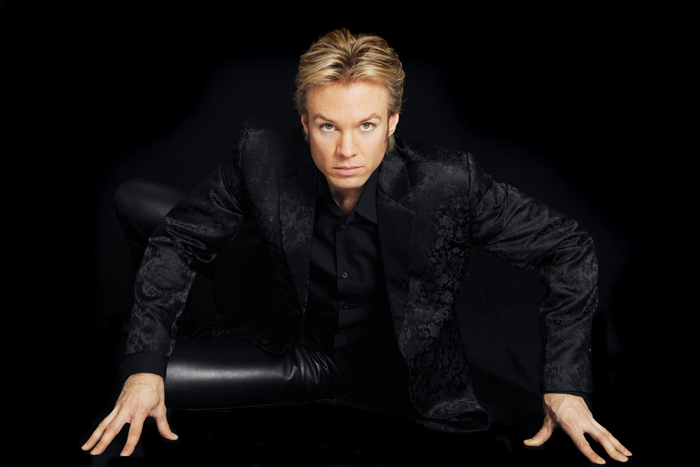
- Born: 1971 (age 54–55); Zurich, Switzerland
- Occupations: magician, illusionist
- Website: marvey.ch

Peter Marvey is a Swiss magician and illusionist, known for his combination of sleight of hand and large-scale stage illusions.

== Biography ==
In his early childhood, Marvey was fascinated with any form of flying, whether the flight of birds, stage "flying" or aviation. He expressed his passion by creating simple wings made of wood and textile. His parents booked a flight from Zurich to Geneva, for the exclusive reason of allowing him to "experience flight".

He was also fascinated by magic. He soon became aware of his talent for this art and invested all his time and energy in it. He was caught doing finger practice under his desk at school. While still in high school, Marvey created his first illusion, a version of levitating girl. Later on he interrupted his studies to concentrate on creating illusions.

== Magic career ==
Marvey studied, designed and practiced for seven years to create an illusion called "Dream Flying", which made his name in the magic business and became a signature piece. He first performed this illusion in Perpignan, France, in October 1999, for a magic convention. He later performed it live on television in 2001.

Marvey has created seven different flying illusions, as well as the Flying Coach, the Levitating Spectators, the Haunted Balloon Basket, the Flying Screen and other levitation tricks.

For seven years, Marvey studied, designed and practiced for his first flying illusion, "Dream Flying". He invented a system which allowed him to turn and move while flying in more directions than had been achieved before. He made it possible to fly in bright light, for the first time in magic's history. He was the first magician to have changed his costume in mid air, in the fraction of a second. Marvey performed "Dream Flying" the first time in Perpignan, France, in October 1999, for a magic convention.

Marvey is considered the expert when it is about stage-flying illusion. He created seven flying systems. For an exhibition event in Bremen in 2002, he developed a flying which allowed him to fly over the audience.

In the following years, Marvey created six further systems to achieve the same illusion for live productions, television and special conditions. Marvey performed the flying illusion live on television in 2001.

In 2005, Marvey designed a flying illusion for singer Ayumi Hamasaki. In the Saitama Arena in Tokyo and later on in other stadiums, the singer appeared to fly for 60 meters, together with two dancers in a turning ball above the audience.

In 2006, Marvey presented a flying illusion with dolphins for the Japanese television channel TBS.

In 2007, Marvey created the "Flying Coach" illusion for a leading indoor international horse show, the CSI Zurich. The floating coach was pulled by seven horses, and escorted by fairies with huge wings, all in white. About 40,000 spectators had the chance to see this illusion from all around the arena.

Aside from flying illusions, Marvey has created many levitation systems. These include the levitation of spectators live on stage and floating objects which can be watched at close range.

Other grand illusions in his shows include being cut in half at the waist. The legs are on a unicycle which circles the stage, disconnected from the upper body. In another illusion, he dons a Superman-like costume and appears to shorten his legs to less than half their normal length.

Marvey is also a prestidigitator, able to make cards appear out of thin air and disappear again.

In 2009, Marvey worked together with Siegfried & Roy on a special production in Las Vegas. This was the last performance of the magic duo. They presented one of Marvey's illusions “The Fire Appearance”. Marvey and his creative director, Vivi Vega, worked as consultants during the production.

Since 2012, he created up-scale illusions uniting technology and magic innovations. The premiere of the most glamorous illusion existing today "The Diamond Illusion", designed with over 2,000 LED lights and over 100 "Eiffel Tower" flash lights, was presented for the Queen Silvia of Sweden and the Princess of Monaco. The Diamond Illusion was invented and designed by Marvey in Switzerland in 2010 and performed for the first time in Jakarta, Indonesia, in a live show.

In 2014, together with his creative director Vivi Vega, he invented the Strongest Girl and in 2015, the big release of the Illuminon a double levitation took place this illusion includes multiple magic effects and never seen before magic. Other new illusions are the flying carpet (levitation with a child from the audience), take off (an appearance), and the genie lamp.

== Achievements and awards ==
Marvey has won awards in several international magical competitions, where performers are judged by magic experts and prominent people from show business. Prince Albert of Monaco presented him with the Golden Wand trophy in 1996. Marvey received the Merlin Award of the International Magicians Society in 2002.

He won third prize in the Grand Prix Manipulation category at the 19th world championship of the Fédération Internationale des Sociétés Magiques (FISM) in 1994 in Yokohama, Japan.

In 1993, he received an award from The Society of American Magicians. He was Swiss National Champion for 1993–1995.

Awards :

Merlin Award 2017 for the "Most Original Illusionist of The Century" and for his director, Vivi Vega, The Merlin Award 2017 for the "Best Creative Director of an Illusion Show"

The BrandLaureate Grand Master Brand Icon Leadership Award 2014 He was chosen as the Grand Master of Magic for his creativity and uniqueness. For being an inventor and developer of new technology in magic and for been followed by many. The "Brand Laureate award” is given annually to outstanding Malaysian entrepreneurs or international personalities, such as Hillary Clinton, Nelson Mandela, Steve Jobs and Sepp Blatter.

The Golden Grola Award 2011 It was presented to Marvey in Italy; other title holders are Roberto Benigni, Gina Lollobrigida and Marcello Mastroianni.

Merlin Award of the International Magicians Society 2009 Marvey was recognized as for been The Most Creative Illusionist

Merlin Award of the International Magicians Society 2002 Marvey was recognized as The Magician of the Year.

Golden Wand Trophy 1996 In 1996, Marvey was the first Winner of the XII Grand Prix Magiques De Monte Carlo presented by Prince Albert of Monaco.

Prize winner at the Grand Prix Manipulation category 1994 On the 19th world championship of the Fédération Internationale des Sociétés Magiques (FISM) in 1994 in Yokohama, Japan.[2]

SAM Award 1993 He received this award from The Society of American Magicians.

Swiss National Champion of Magic from 1993 to 1995.

== Theatre ==
In 2009, Marvey opened a 99-seat theater in Feusisberg (near Pfäffikon, Schwyz), Switzerland. He regularly performs there and the theatre can be booked for private shows

== See also ==
- List of magicians
- List of people from Zurich
