= Caspar Röist =

Commander of the Papal Swiss Guard (1478–1527)

- Born: 13 July 1478; Zürich, Switzerland
- Died: 6 May 1527 (aged 48); Rome, Papal State
- Military career
- Allegiance: Holy See; Papal States
- Branch: Swiss Guard
- Rank: Captain
- Conflicts: Sack of Rome (1527): Stand of the Swiss Guard †

Caspar Röist (13 July 1478 – 6 May 1527) was a Swiss papal official and commander of the papacy's Swiss Guard. He died whilst commanding it in its last stand during the sack of Rome in 1527.

A native of Zürich, and son of mayor of Zürich and colonel of the Swiss Guard Marx Röist (1454–1524), Röist was a student in Basel in 1494, and is recorded as a judge in Zürich during 1500–1505. He married Anna Meyer of Knonau in 1500, and later Elisabeth Klingler, likely in 1517. He served in the papal guard in the rank of a captain as a deputy in the absence of his father during 1518–1524, and after the death of his father as commander from August 1524 until his death.

Politically, the years of the service of Kaspar Röist were among the hardest, particularly in the diplomatic tensions between the Holy See and the Holy Roman Empire in 1527 which resulted in the sack of Rome, perpetrated by Landsknechts, Spanish, and Italian mercenaries in the pay of the Emperor Charles V who was determined to reassert their supremacy over the Church of the Empire. During the assault on Rome, Kaspar Röist had fortified himself at the head of the 189 recruits in the Teutonic Cemetery, around the central obelisk in the cemetery desperately trying to resist but to no avail, covering the flight of Pope Clement VII to Castel Sant'Angelo. Röist was wounded during this battle and later sought refuge in his house, but was followed by the troops, who killed him in front of his wife.

Military offices
Preceded by Marx Röist	Commander of the Pontifical Swiss Guard; 1524–1527	Succeeded by Jost von Meggen
