= Ursula Mauch =

Swiss politician

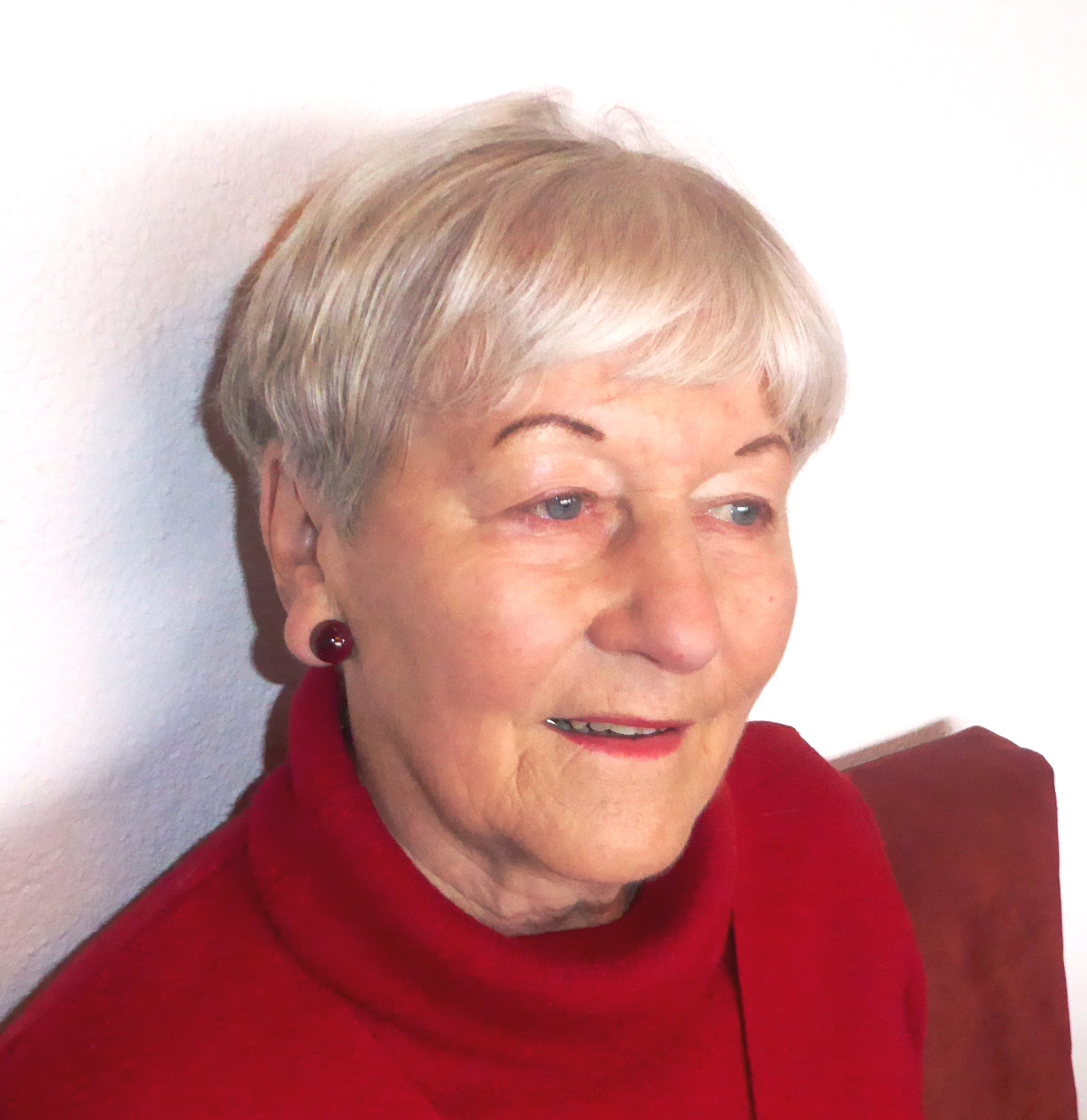
- Mauch, c. 2015

Member of National Council (Switzerland)
- In office 26 November 1979 – 3 December 1995
- Constituency: Canton of Aargau

Member of Grand Council of Aargau
- In office 1974–1980

Personal details
- Born: Ursula Widmer; 29 March 1935 (age 91) Oftringen, Switzerland
- Party: Social Democratic Party
- Spouse: Samuel Mauch (m. 1958)
- Children: 3, including Corine

Ursula Mauch (née Widmer; born 29 March 1935) is a Swiss chemist, educator and politician who served on the National Council (Switzerland) from 1979 to 1995. She was the first female member to represent the Canton of Aargau constituency. She previously served on the Grand Council of Aargau from 1974 to 1980 for the Social Democratic Party. She is the mother of Corine Mauch, who was Mayor of Zurich.

== Early life and education ==
Mauch was born 29 March 1935 in Oftringen, Switzerland to Ernst Widmer, a butcher, and Margaritha Widmer. Her younger brother, Hans Widmer (b. 1940), became an industrialist who was chief executive officer and chairman of Oerlikon-Bührle. Mauch initially completed the École du Commerce in Neuchatel, followed by a diploma in chemistry at Technikum Winterthur (today Zurich University of Applied Sciences, Winterthur).

== Career ==
Upon her return from the US, she became a chemistry and physics teacher at the commercial college in Aarau. In 1986, she and her husband founded the research and communication agency INFRAS, which primarily consults in environmental issues.

== Politics ==
In 1974, she was elected to serve on the Grand Council of Aargau, a position she held through 1980. Ultimately, she was the first female member of the National Council (Switzerland) from 1979 to 1995.

== Personal life ==
In 1958, she married Samuel Mauch (b. 1935), with whom she moved to the United States, where she resided between 1959 and 1964 and again in 1970/71, when her husband was a professor at the Massachusetts Institute of Technology in Cambridge, Massachusetts. Her eldest daughter, Corine Mauch, was born in Iowa City, Iowa in 1960.
