= Coronation of King Charles =

Coronation of King Charles may refer to:

- Coronation of Charles V in 1530 as Holy Roman Emperor
- Coronation of Charles II in 1651 as King of Scotland
- Coronation of Charles III in 2023 as King of the United Kingdom
