= Corine Mauch =

American-born Swiss politician

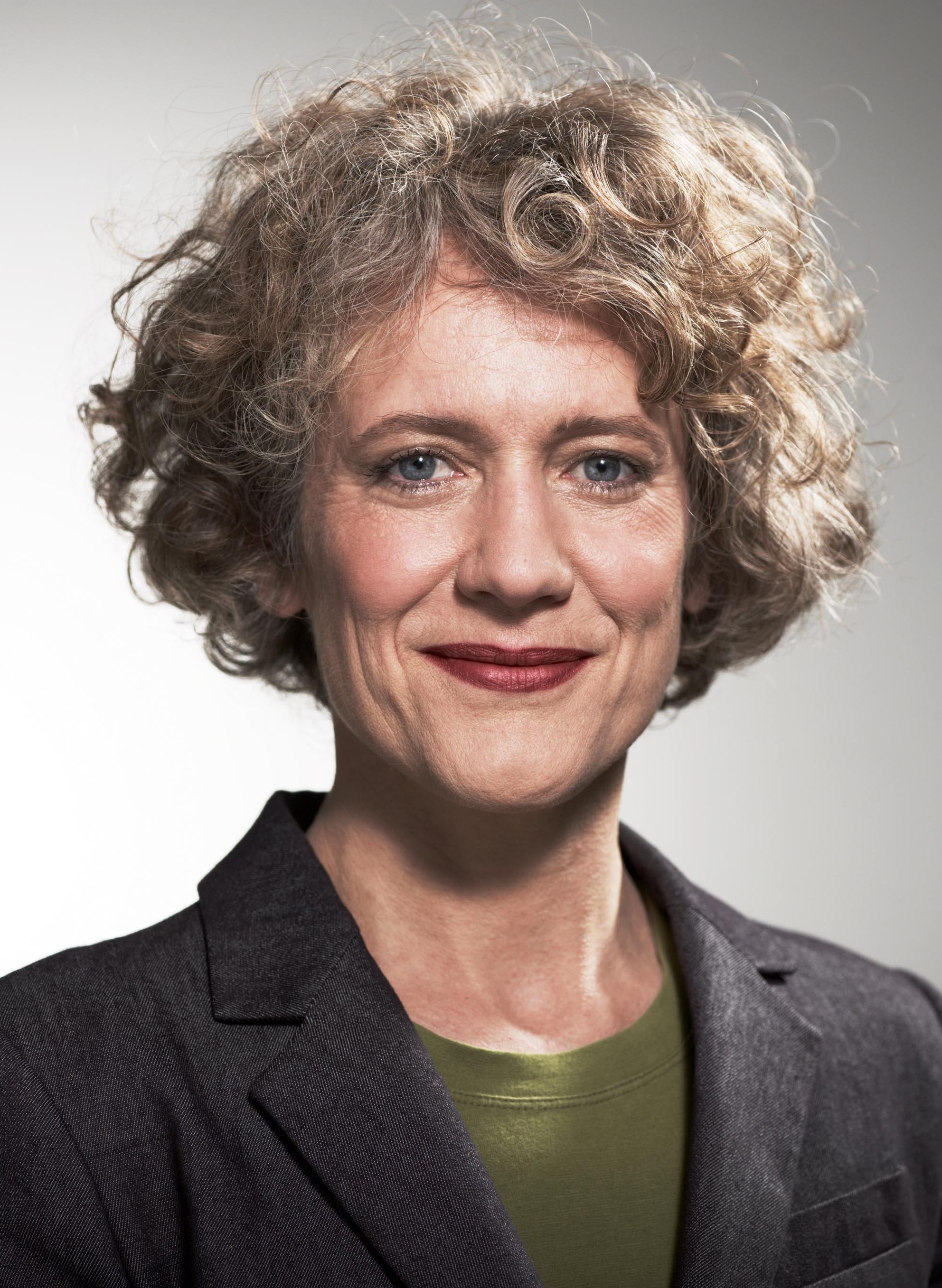

Mayor of Zurich
- Incumbent
- Assumed office 1 May 2009
- Preceded by: Elmar Ledergerber

Personal details
- Born: 28 May 1960 (age 66) Iowa City, Iowa, U.S.
- Citizenship: Switzerland; United States (until 2013)
- Party: Social Democratic
- Spouse: Juliana Maria Müller (m. 2014)
- Parent(s): Ursula Mauch; Samuel Mauch
- Education: ETH Zurich (Diploma); University of Zurich; University of Lausanne (MPA)
- Website: Official website

Corine Mauch (born 28 May 1960) is an American-born Swiss politician who served as Mayor of Zurich from 2009 to 2026. She previously served on the city council of Zürich between 1999 and 2008 for the Social Democratic Party of Switzerland (of which she was a member since 1990). Mauch is the first female and first openly lesbian person to be elected mayor of the city.

== Early life ==
Corine Mauch was born 28 May 1960 in Iowa City, Iowa to Samuel Mauch, an engineer, and Ursula Mauch (née Widmer), a chemistry teacher. Mauch lived in Boston, where her father worked at MIT as a doctoral student, until age four. Her family then moved back to the rural village of Oberlunkhofen in Switzerland, though Mauch spent another year in the US at age ten. In Oberlunkhofen, Mauch and her two younger brothers were the only protestant students in the school.

In 1976, Samuel and Ursula Mauch founded Infras, a research and consulting agency focused on sustainable development. In 1979, Ursula Mauch became the first woman to represent Aargau in the National Council, serving until 1995. From 1987 to 1995, Ursula Mauch was also the first female parliamentary leader of the Social Democratic Party of Switzerland.

== Education and career ==
Corine Mauch graduated from gymnasium in Aarau. From 1980 to 1988, Mauch studied agricultural economics at ETH Zurich, also completed four semesters of sinology at the University of Zurich, graduating with an engineering Diplom. She then worked internships in agriculture and development in Nepal and the Bernese Oberland. From 1997 to 2000, Mauch studied at the University of Lausanne, earning a Master of Public Administration; her thesis was in "city development politics".

Mauch's first job was at Infras, the consulting agency founded by her parents, where she worked between 1986 and 1989. Mauch also worked as an assistant at the Economic Research Institute (Note: German: Institut für Wirtschaftsforschung, now the KOF Swiss Economic Institute (German: Konjunkturforschungsstelle)) of ETH Zurich between 1987 and 1988. From 1989 to 1993, Mauch worked for the city of Uster, managing waste disposal and the environment. From 1993, Mauch worked as a researcher and lecturer in the Human Ecology Group at the Geographical Institute of ETH Zurich. In 2000, she moved to the University of Lausanne, continuing to research environmental politics and resource management. From 2002 to 2008, Mauch worked as an environmental consultant in Luzern, later doing similar work at the federal Parlamentsdienste (lit. 'Parliamentary Services') in Bern.

== Political career ==
Mauch was elected mayor in March 2009, after ten years on the city council. In the first round of balloting, she finished in second place, barely 1,300 votes behind Kathrin Martelli, the candidate of the Free Democratic Party. In the second round, she received 41,745 votes, beating Martelli by 58 percent to 42. In the March 2018 elections, Mauch received 63,139 votes, and she was re-elected as mayor of Zürich until her terms ends in 2022. After being re-elected in 2022, she did not run for re-election in 2026.

== Personal life ==
Since 2014, Mauch is legally married to her long-time partner Juliana Maria Müller. Mauch began the procedure to renounce her United States citizenship in 2012; her office confirmed media reports of the renunciation in April 2013.
