= Antonio Tebaldeo =

Italian poet

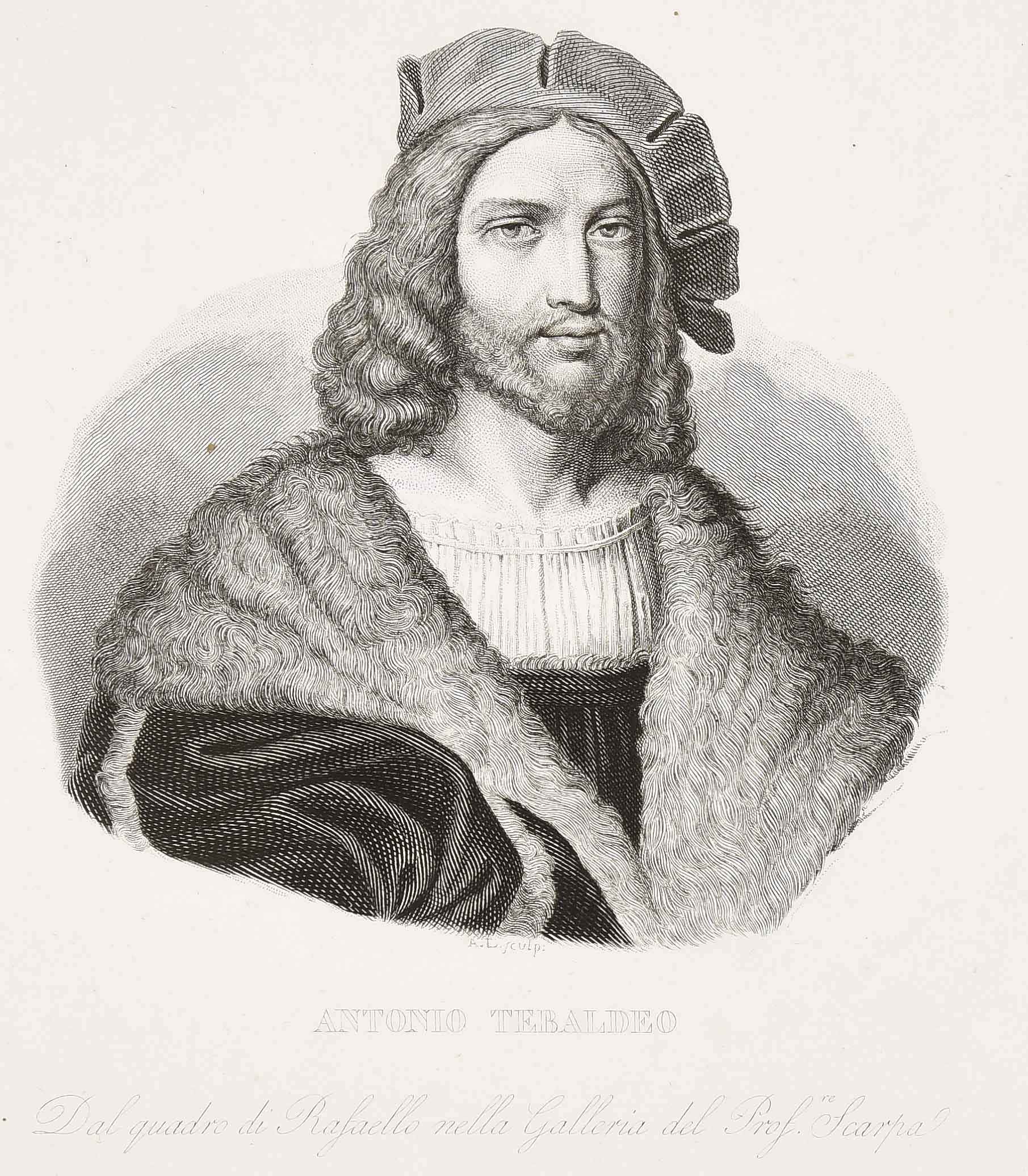
Antonio Tebaldeo

Antonio Tebaldeo (1463–1537) was an Italian poet. He figured among the writers of the time who engaged in the discussion concerning the nature of literary Italian.

== Life ==
Tebaldeo was born at Ferrara. He changed his family name (Tebaldi) to Tebaldeo, in consonance with the practice of the Humanists, who sought to Latinize the form of their appellation as much as possible. After serving as tutor to Isabella d'Este and secretary to Lucrezia Borgia, he came to the court of Pope Leo X at Rome, enjoying the favour of the pope and the companionship of many erudite men and artists. He lost all his means in the sack of Rome (1527), and spent the remainder of his life in very narrow circumstances.

== Works ==
He wrote verse in both Latin and Italian. His Italian verse is remarkable for diction and style rather than for any poetical excellence. With his artificial manner, his abuse of metaphor, and his studied imagery he was a forerunner of those extravagant versifiers who, in the seventeenth century, developed the movement called Marinism or Secentismo.

A redaction of Poliziano's play Orfeo, which has been ascribed to Tebaldeo, aims to make that piece accord better with the principles of classic composition. See his verse in the edition of Venice, 1530, "Di M. Antonio Tebaldeo ferrarese l'opere d'amore".
