= Coronation of Charles V =

1520 coronation in Italy

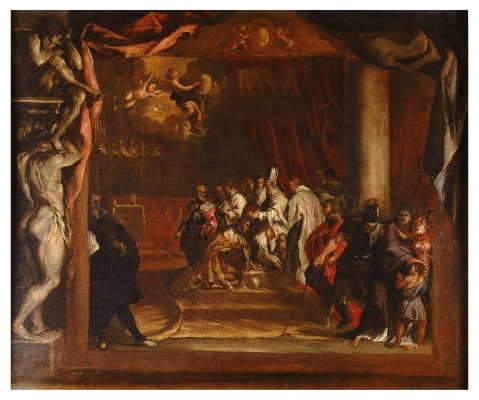
Luigi Scaramuccia. Coronation of Charles V as Holy Roman Emperor, 1661. Sketch for the frescoes in the Sala Farnese of the Palazzo d'Accursio in Bologna. Genus Bononiae Collezioni.

Charles V was crowned Holy Roman Emperor by Pope Clement VII in the San Petronio Basilica in Bologna on 24 February 1530. He was the last Holy Roman Emperor to be crowned by a pope. The emperor was also crowned King of Italy on 22 February, also the last coronation of an Italian king by a pope.

== Context for the coronation ==
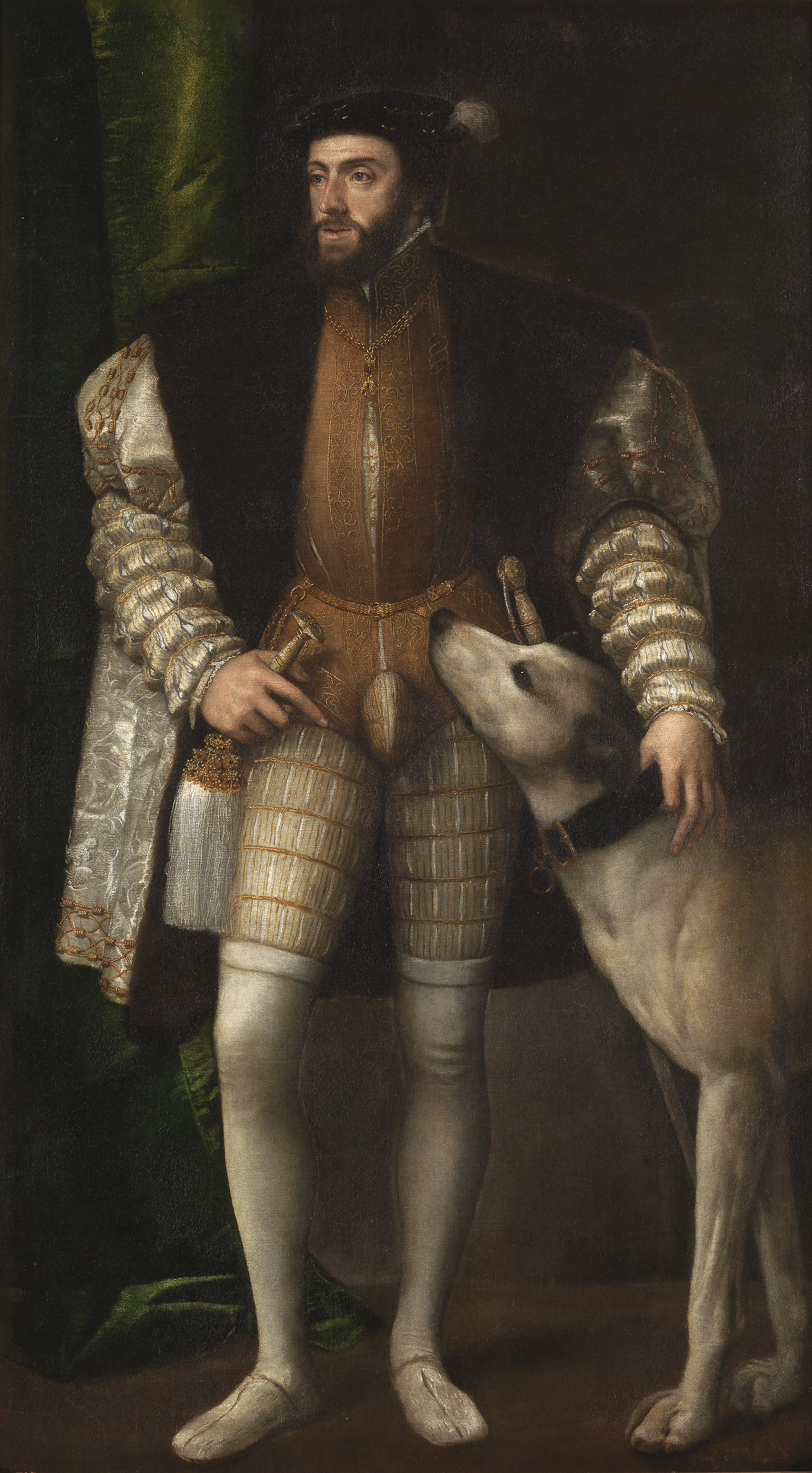
Titian. Portrait of Charles V with a Dog. The portrait now in the Museo del Prado was started in Bologna in 1530, on the occasion of the coronation of Charles V.

Pope Clement VII de' Medici and Charles V agreed to the imperial coronation as a means to heal the political and religious conflicts that had divided the Italian and European world and to reach a "universal peace" in the Christian West that would ensure a more effective defence against Turkish aggression which had reached the gates of Vienna in 1529. Preparations for the meeting between the two sovereigns encountered difficulties and delays due to the Pope's skepticism of Charles V's proposals. One concern, among others, was the location of this meeting. Pope Clement VII preferred Rome but Charles V chose instead Bologna, given that many Romans blamed Charles for the Sack of Rome (1527), which was carried out by his mutinous troops. This moment of extreme conflict between Papacy and Empire led to intense diplomatic activity during 1529, a rapprochement of the adversary parties formalised in the Treaty of Barcelona, which paved the way to their meeting in Bologna.

== Arrival of Clement VII and Charles V in Bologna ==
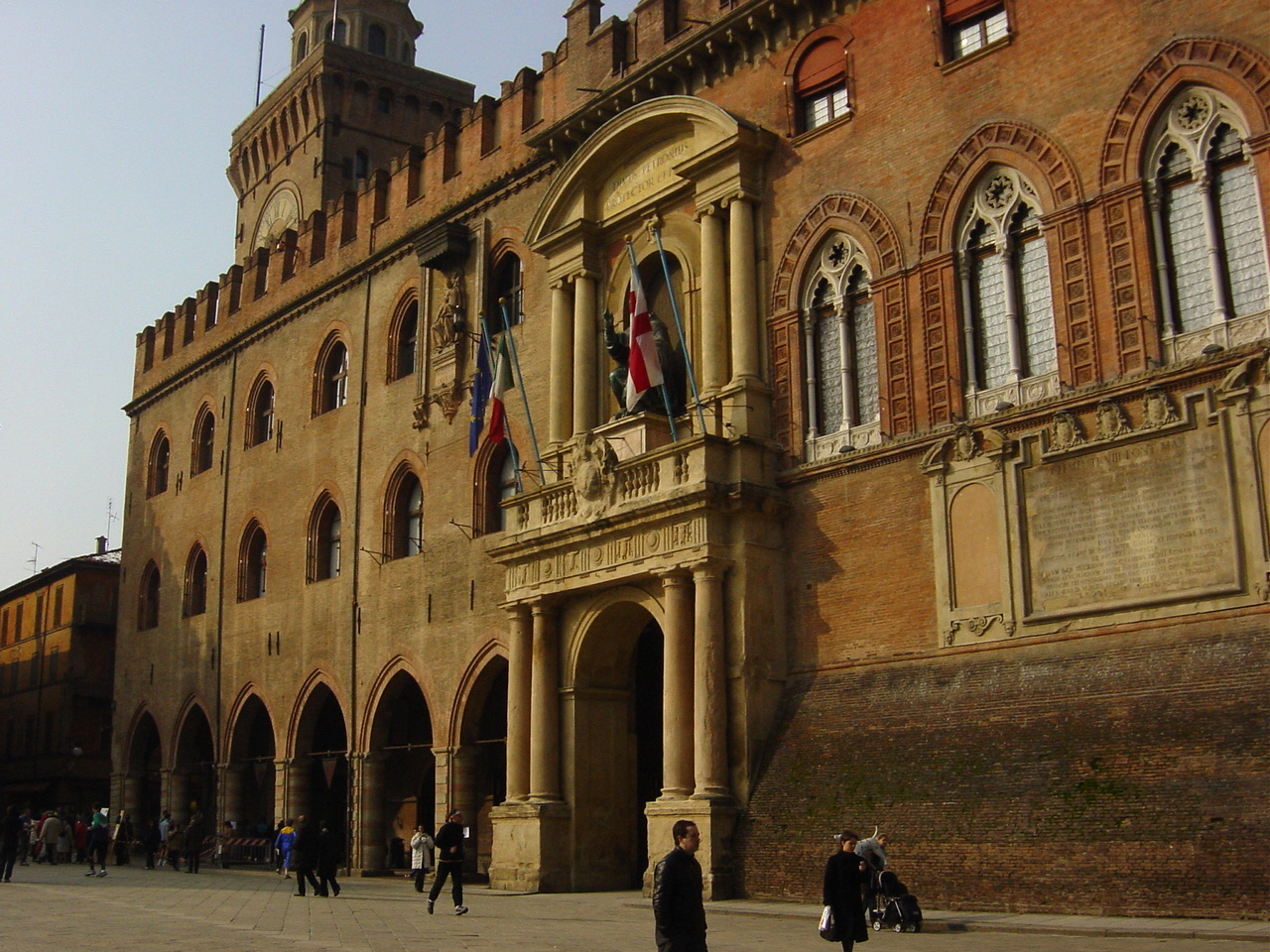
Palazzo d'Accursio in Bologna where Charles V and Pope Clement VII lodged in 1529–30 on the occasion of the coronation.

Nobility and laymen prepared during the last months of 1529 to host the Pope and the future Emperor with their very extensive retinues. The city became a sort of stage theatre of the world, where the crafts and artistic skills of the Bolognese were put to the test. It was a prestigious occasion that received positive reviews, although no one had predicted that the guests would stay as long as they did. Clement VII arrived in Bologna on October 20, 1529, crossing the lands of his state: official sources of the time wrote that the Pope was splendidly received, but not without reservations from the populace, due to the taxes he imposed to mount a crusade against the Turks. Charles V travelled by sea from Barcelona to Genoa and continued on to Piacenza, Reggio Emilia, Castelfranco Emilia and Borgo Panigale to reach Bologna the following November 5: "... upon his arrival the emperor had all the artillery unloaded, and on the square in front of the Palace of the Podestà a fountain was installed in the shape of a black eagle in the middle of two lions. The eagle poured red wine all day long, one of the lions poured white wine, and the other water. And it was a very gratifying thing to the Landsknechte, who nearby roasted a whole beef full of different animals with golden horns and feet. And from the pacala was thrown bread, cheese and meat...". Pope Clement and Emperor Charles both lodged at the Palazzo Pubblico, today Palazzo d'Accursio, in adjoining rooms that allowed the sovereigns and their main representatives to meet frequently between the various events and ceremonies. On January 30, 1530, the date of the coronation was agreed for the following February 24 (the Emperor's birthday). The choice of place fell on the Basilica of San Petronio, the largest and most spacious religious building, deeply rooted in the tradition of the city of Bologna.

== The Iron Crown ==
On February 22, two days before the imperial coronation, Charles V received the Iron Crown of Lombardy as King of Italy in the Chapel of the Legate, today the Farnese Chapel, in Palazzo d'Accursio: ". ..His Majesty rose from his chair, and went to see Our Lord and kissed his foot, and afterwards the sword, the world, the sceptre and the crown were brought before His Holiness, and his Majesty was always on his knees to the feet of Our Lord and His Holiness read certain prayers: first he took the naked sword, blessed it, and put it in the hands of His Majesty who put it back in the sheath, and Our Lord with his hands put his belt around her, and then His Majesty rose to his feet, and took it out of its sheath, and three times he brandished it, then put it back, and having done this, again His Majesty returned to the feet of Our Lord, and his sanctity put the crown of iron on his head, and then he took the world, and the sceptre, and he gave it to His Majesty as he continued to read prayers... And the ceremonies ended, Our Lord and His Majesty left the chapel ... and went hand in hand to their rooms"

== The Imperial Crown ==
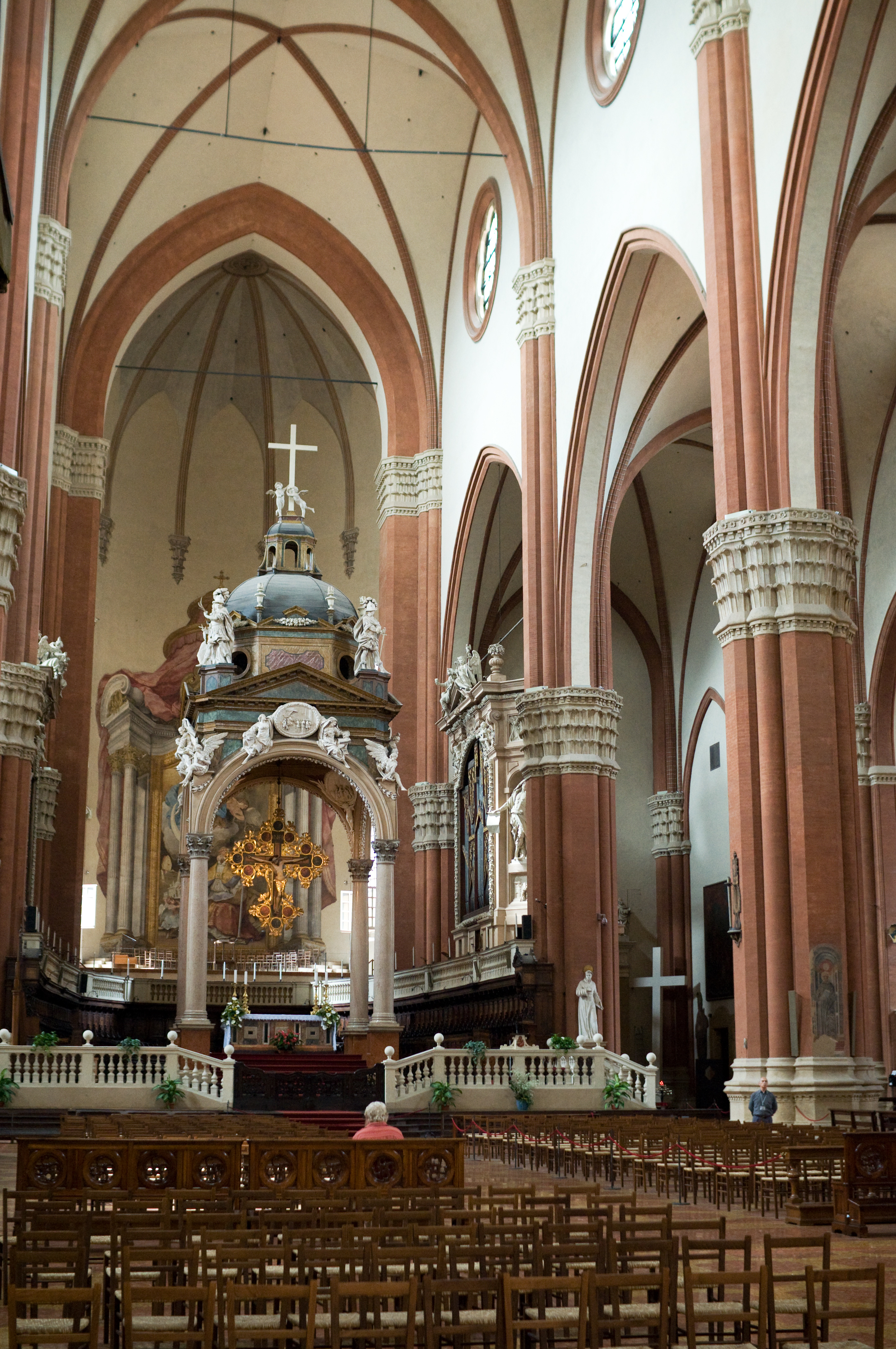
San Petronio Basilica in Bologna where Charles V was crowned Holy Roman Emperor by Pope Clement VII on 24th February 1530.

On the occasion of the coronation of February 24 - the Emperor's birthday - in San Petronio, to make the procession of the sovereigns and the powerful more visible, a bridgeway was erected that connected the rooms of the public palace in which Charles V and Clement VII stayed with the Saint Petronius Basilica:

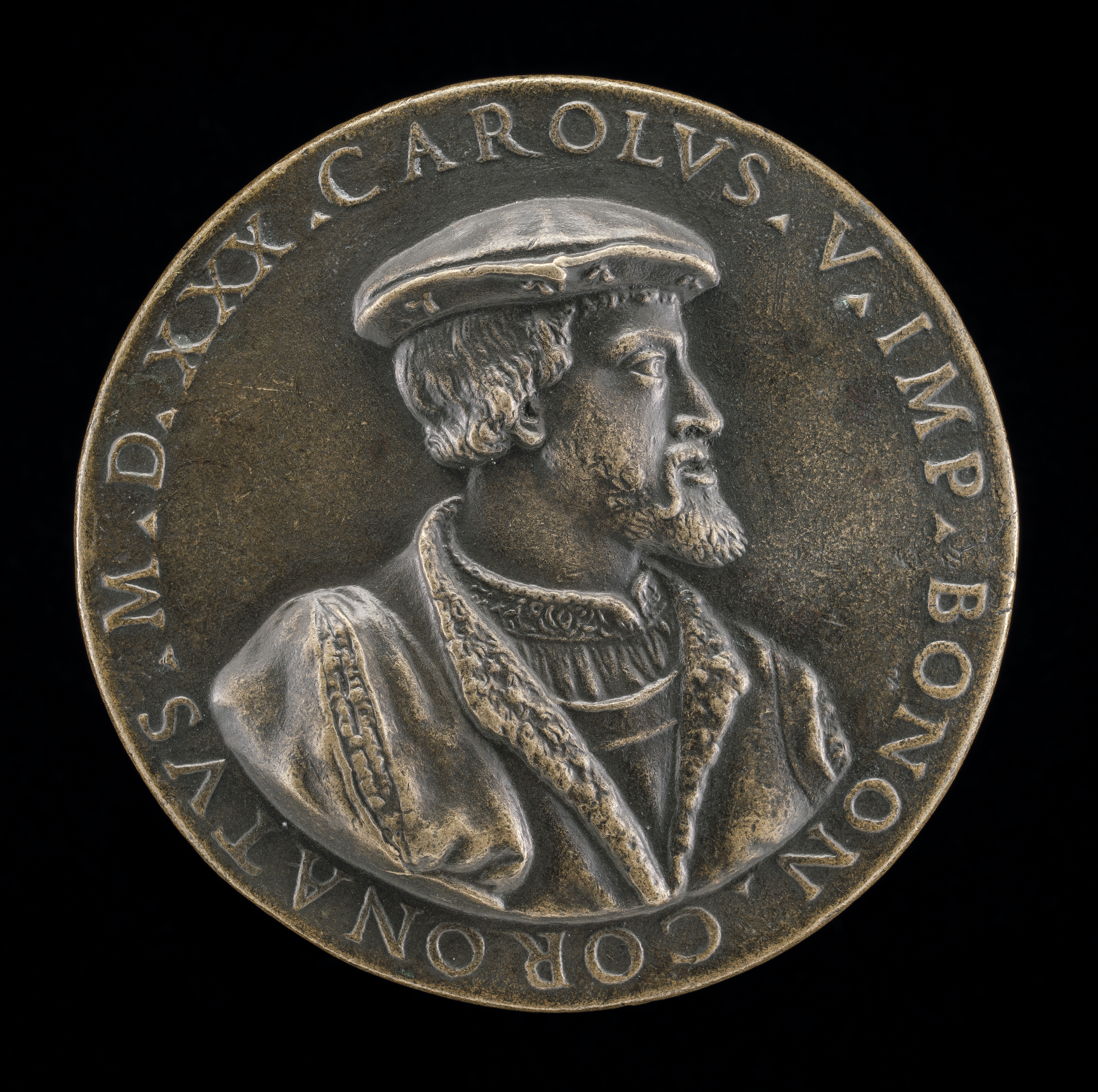
"Coronation Medal of Charles V". Giovanni Bernardi, 1530.

"...for the multitude of the people who had come to see this coronation, Our Lord for not having any impediment in going there from the palace in San Petronio, where he was determined to be crowned, and still to make the apparatus more superb, he had a lumber bridge made, which was two hundred and fifty in length and nine feet wide, for which he could go from the Pope's palace to the main altar of San Petronio."; in the church chapels and tribunes had been built in the likeness of St. Peter's in the Vatican, richly decorated; the city was fortified for security reasons; Piazza Maggiore and the doors were closed by Antonio de Leyva and his soldiers armed to protect Charles V. The Mass was long and solemn and the Emperor knelt before the Pope after having pronounced the ritual formulas, received the golden crown, in the presence of the representatives of all the Italian states and a considerable part of the peninsula's aristocracy: " ... the Pope gave the emperor the insignia of the emperor, gave him the golden sceptre all worked on top with which he religiously commanded the nations, the naked sword with which he persecuted the enemies of the name of Christ, the golden apple to signify the world he would reign with singular piety, virtue and constancy, and finally he put on his head the imperial crown, and knelt as he was, his foot set, and worshiped. not far from the Pope in a chair covered with gold brocade d'or, but slightly lower, and was called Roman Emperor. In the Piazza awaited Antonio de Leyva with a lot of cavalry and armed infantry, who, hearing shouting that the Emperor was crowned "Viva Carlo V Imperatore Invittissimo", had all the big bombards shot ".

== The Procession ==
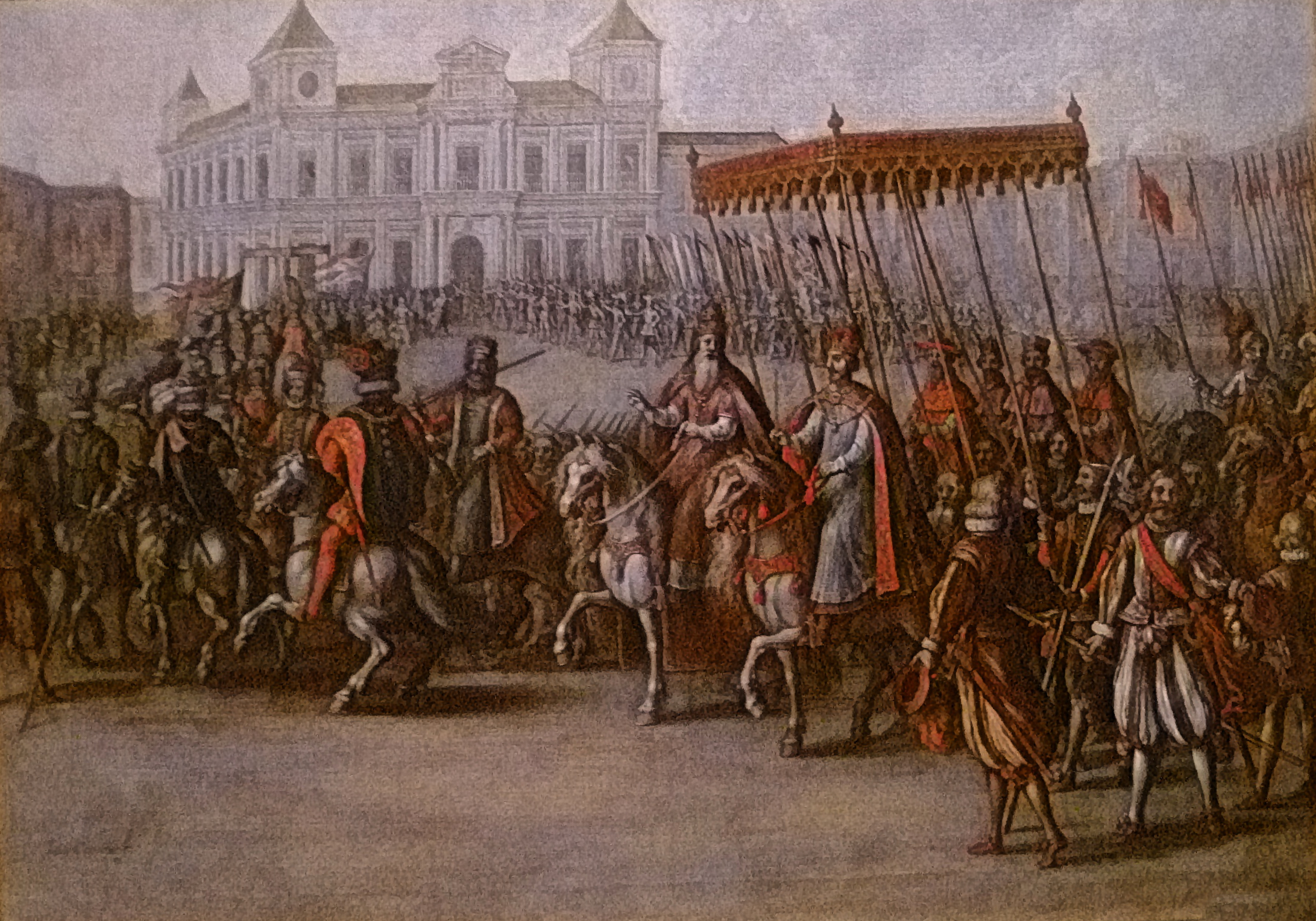
Juan de la Corte (1597-1660). "Procession for the imperial coronation of Charles V in Bologna on 24th February 1530"; Museum of Santa Cruz, Toledo, Spain

After the coronation, a procession on horse set off from Piazza Maggiore passing through Via Orefici and through the streets of the city. The two sovereigns rode under a single canopy followed by magnates, magistrates and lawyers with their respective banners, the governor of Bologna, four chaplains of the pope, ambassadors of various states, various princes, dukes, marquises and counts, the college of cardinals, various prelates and German and Spanish soldiers led by their general captain. Soon, however, the procession fell apart and while the Pope and his retinue returned to the Palazzo Pubblico, the Emperor with another canopy continued with his retinue for another ceremony, up to Basilica of San Domenico where " ... he was brought to the high altar and placed on the Faldstool. He removed the crown off his head and without a crown he prayed, and everyone received a kiss of peace". Charles V, who had already shown his magnificence along the way by “seeding money”, named some Bolognese gentlemen and counts as knights and then returned to the Palazzo Pubblico with his court.

== Bibliography ==
- Leandro Alberti, Descrizione di tutt' Italia, Bologna, A. Giaccarelli, 1550, p. 297
- Bonita Cleri, Il Trionfo di Carlo V ovvero il Trionfo Di Francesco Maria I Della Rovere, sta in Feliciano Paoli (a cura di), Il trionfo di Carlo V, Catalogo della Mostra omonima 27 Luglio - 31 Agosto 1991, Comune di Urbania - Museo Civico. Urbania 1991.
- Leandro Alberti, Historie di Bologna, t. II, (1511-1543), a cura di Armando Antonelli e Maria Rosaria Musti, Bologna, Costa, 2006
- Roberto Righi (a cura di), Carlo V a Bologna. Cronache e documenti dell'incoronazione (1530), Bologna, Costa Editore, 2000
- Adriano Prosperi, voce Clemente VII in Enciclopedia dei Papi, III, Roma, Treccani, 2000, pp. 89–91
- Emilio Pasquini e Paolo Prodi (a cura di), Bologna nell'età di Carlo V e di Guicciardini, Bologna, Il Mulino, 2002

== See also ==
- Coronation of the Holy Roman Emperor
- San Petronio Basilica
- Holy Roman Emperor
