= Marx Röist =

Mayor of Zürich (1454-1524), commander of the Papal Swiss Guard

Marx Röist (7 August 1454–15 June 1524) was a member of the political elite of Zürich, and from 1517 the second commander of the Papal Swiss Guard.

== Biography ==
The son of a wealthy patrician and city councillor, Heinrich Röist, he served as Schultheiß from 1476 and represented the Konstaffel guild in the city council from 1489. He served as city treasurer from 1493, and as reeve of Altstetten from 1493. He was elected mayor of Zürich in 1505. His political influence was considerable. He participated in most of the Diets of the Confederacy during 1500–1520, and he was the leader of the Swiss delegations to Louis XII of France in 1499 and to Pope Julius II in 1512. He was knighted after the Battle of Murten in 1476, and served as an officer in all Confederate military actions during 1476 until 1515. He commanded the Swiss troops in the Battle of Marignano in 1515.

He was nominally the commander of the Papal Swiss Guard from 1517 until his death, but he was deputized by his son, Caspar Röist from 1518. During the Reformation in Zürich, Röist was in general agreement with Huldrych Zwingli, excepting Zwingli's iconoclasm, vehemently opposing the removal of religious imagery from the churches. He died before the conflict with Zwingli escalated, and the city council enacted the decree permitting the removal of saints' images still on the very day of his death, 15 June 1524.
