= Jeanne Eder-Schwyzer =

Swiss women's rights activist

Jeanne Eder-Schwyzer (March 2, 1894 in New York – October 24, 1957 in Zurich) was a Swiss women's rights activist and President of the International Council of Women.

== Life ==
Jeanne Eder-Schwyzer was the daughter of Dr. Fritz Schwyzer and grew up in New York. She studied chemistry at the University of Zurich and was awarded her doctorate in 1919. The following year, she married the chemist and Professor of Pharmacognosy and Pharmaceutical Chemistry Robert Eder (1885–1944). She was the mother of two daughters, the physicist Monika Eder and Ursula Elisabeth Eder, better known as Ulla Dydo, noted Gertrude Stein scholar.

Eder-Schwyzer was co-founder of a home for women students in Zurich and collaborator on the "Swiss Exhibition for Women's Work" (Saffa) in 1928. She was involved in the petition for Women's suffrage in Switzerland in 1929, and was a promoter of the Swiss and Zurich Association of Women Academics, which she presided from 1935 to 1938.

From 1939 on, she participated in women's politics at several levels: as president of the Free Democratic Party of Switzerland's women's group in Zurich (which she co-founded in 1935); as President of the Association for Women's Voting Rights (SVF) in the canton of Zurich; as a member of the civilian women's auxiliary service, from which she retired in 1945. She led the 3rd Swiss Women's Congress in 1946 and subsequently participated in the establishment of the Swiss Institute for Home Economics (SIH, 1948–1992). She was president of the women's group of the Swiss Enlightenment Service from 1947 to 1950, was a member (1949–1957) of the board of the Bund Schweizerischer Frauenvereine (BSF), and was sent by the BSF to the Swiss UNESCO Commission, from 1949 to 1954. Eder-Schwyzer was President of the International Council of Women from 1947 until her death in 1957.
