= Ulla Dydo =

- Born: 1925; Zurich, Switzerland
- Died: 2017 (aged 91–92); New York, United States
- Occupations: Writer; editor; teacher
- Writing career
- Language: English
- Notable work: Gertrude Stein: The Language That Rises (2003)

Ulla E. Dydo (February 4, 1925 – September 10, 2017) was a Swiss-born writer, editor and noted Gertrude Stein scholar. She was Professor Emerita at the Brooklyn College and Bronx Community College of the City University of New York system and author of Gertrude Stein: The Language That Rises, 1923–1934.

== Early life ==
Ulla E. Dydo was born Ursula Elisabeth Eder in Zürich, Switzerland, in 1925. Her parents were Jeanne Eder-Schwyzer (1894–1957) and Dr. Robert Eder (1885–1944).

After studying at University of Zurich and University College London, Dydo moved to the United States. She received an MA from Bryn Mawr College in 1948 and a PhD from University of Wisconsin–Madison, in 1955, with a dissertation on "The Poetry of Allen Tate."

== Career ==
She was a professor of English at Brooklyn College]from 1958 to 1966, and then lived in Lagos, Nigeria, until 1969, doing work for the Nigerian National Museum and studying Hausa poetry. Starting in 1970 she was a professor of English at Bronx Community College.

Fluent in German, Italian, and French, Dydo was editor of Odyssey Review: A Quarterly of Modern Latin American & European Literature in English Translation from 1961 to 1963.

By the 1970s, Dydo turned to Gertrude Stein, whose work would be at the center of her research and writing for the rest of her life. She worked closely with Leon Katz, Bill Rice and Edward Burns. With Burns, she edited The Letters of Gertrude Stein and Thornton Wilder (1996). In 1993 she published A Stein Reader, notable both for the selections and the illuminating headnotes. Because of Dydo's extensive research on the Stein papers at the Beinecke Library (Yale University), she was able to provide detailed textual scholarship about individual Stein works, such as had not been previously available. The years of study culminated in Dydo's major work, Gertrude Stein: The Language that Rises 1923–1934, published in 2003.

Her later work turned to the poetry of Cecil Taylor.

She died in New York City in 2017, at age 92.

== Personal life ==
She married the economist John Stephen Dydo (1922–2004) in 1963 and had a son in 1967. She later married the new music pianist Nurit Tilles.

Dydo frequently attended downtown poetry readings, dance, theater, and music events, and she was a generous supporter of related arts organizations.

== Published works ==
- Dydo, Ulla E., ed. A Stein Reader. Northwestern UP, 1993.
- Burns, Edward, and Ulla E. Dydo, eds., with William Rice. The Letters of Gertrude Stein and Thornton Wilder. New Haven: Yale UP, 1996.
- Dydo, Ulla E., with William Rice. Gertrude Stein: The Language That Rises, 1923–1934. Northwestern UP, 2003.
