= Elmar Ledergerber =

Swiss politician

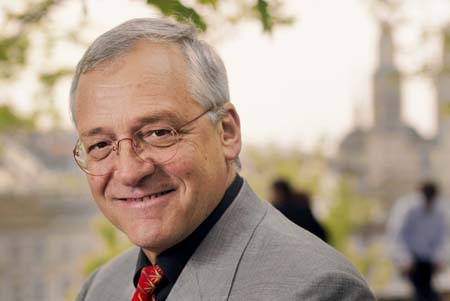
Elmar Ledergerber

Elmar Ledergerber (born April 4, 1944 in Engelberg) is a former Mayor of Zurich, a position he held from 2002 until his resignation in 2009. He is a member of the Social Democratic Party of Switzerland and was once named one of the most outstanding mayors of the year by a London think-tank. However he has also been criticized for not seeing through projects. He was president of Zurich Tourism from 2009 until resigning in 2015.

Ledergerber holds a doctoral degree in economics from the University of St. Gallen.
