= Daniel Barben =

Swiss academic

Daniel Barben (born June 10, 1961 in Zurich, Switzerland) is professor of Science, Technology and Society Studies at the Institute of Science, Technology and Society Studies at Alpen-Adria-Universität Klagenfurt.

== Education ==
Barben studied Sociology, Psychology, Political Science and Philosophy at Freie Universität Berlin from 1982 to 1989. He gained his doctorate at the Faculty of Economics and Social Sciences, University of Potsdam in 1995. He habilitated at the Department of Political and Social Sciences, FU Berlin, in 2004. From April 2010 to December 2013, he held a chair of futures studies at the Institute of Political Science at Aachen University RWTH Aachen.

== Career ==
Since 2014, he holds a chair of Science, Technology and Society Studies at Alpen-Adria-Universität Klagenfurt. His main fields of research are the interdependencies between processes of technical and social changes facing global problems in health, nutrition, energy, mobility, demography and climate matters.

== Selected publications ==
- Converging Technologies, Transhumanism, and Future Society. In: Hava Tirosh-Samuelson, Kenneth Mossman (Ed.): Building a Better Human? Refocusing the Debate on Transhumanism. Frankfurt/M., Berlin, Bern, Bruxelles, New York, Oxford, Wien 2012: Peter Lang, 379-396.
- Acceptance Politics." In: David H. Guston (Ed.): Encyclopedia of Nanoscience and Society, Vol. 1. Thousand Oaks, Cal. 2010: Sage Reference, 4-5.
- Anticipatory Governance." In: David H. Guston (Ed.): Encyclopedia of Nanoscience and Society, Vol. 1. Thousand Oaks, Cal. 2010: Sage Reference, 17-18.
- Innovation." In: David H. Guston (Ed.): Encyclopedia of Nanoscience and Society, Vol. 1. Thousand Oaks, Cal. 2010: Sage Reference, 335-337.
- Reflexive Governance." In: David H. Guston (Ed.): Encyclopedia of Nanoscience and Society, Vol. 2. Thousand Oaks, Cal. 2010: Sage Reference, 654-655.
- Social Science." In: David H. Guston (Ed.): Encyclopedia of Nanoscience and Society, Vol.2. Thousand Oaks, Cal. 2010: Sage Reference, 724-726.
- Glossary of Nanoscale Science and Engineering." In: David H. Guston (Ed.): Encyclopedia of Nanoscience and Society, Vol. 2. Thousand Oaks, Cal. 2010: Sage Reference, 803-809.
- Reflexive Governance toward Sustainable Development: Combining Deliberation, Anticipation, and Transformation." Talk. 1st European Conference on Sustainability Transitions: Dynamics and Governance of Transitions to Sustainability, Amsterdam, the Netherlands.
- Security, Identification, and Citizenship: The Configuration of Biometrics in National and Transnational Contexts." Poster presentation. Gordon Research Conference on Governing Emerging Technologies, Big Sky, MT.
- Anticipatory Governance of Nanotechnology: Foresight, Engagement, and Integration." In: Edward J. Hackett, Olga Amsterdamska, Michael E. Lynch, Judy Wajcman (Eds.): Handbook of Science and Technology Studies, Third Edition. Cambridge, Mass. 2008: MIT Press, 979-1000.
- Analyzing Acceptance Politics: Towards an Epistemological Shift in the Public Understanding of Science and Technology." In: Public Understanding of Science, 19(3), May 2010, 274-292 (first published online as doi:10.1177/0963662509335459, June 26, 2009).
