= List of mayors of Zurich =

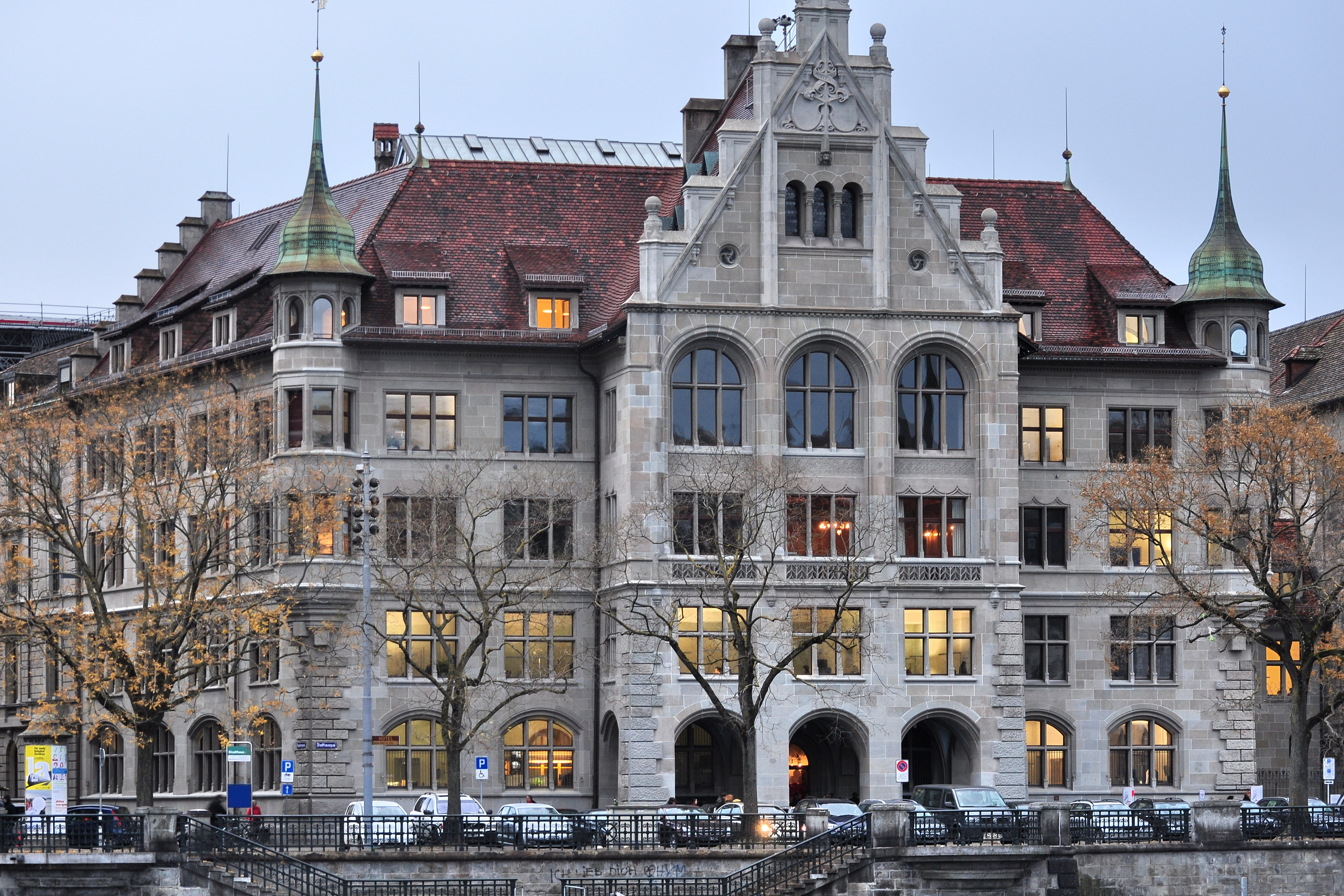
Stadthaus Zürich

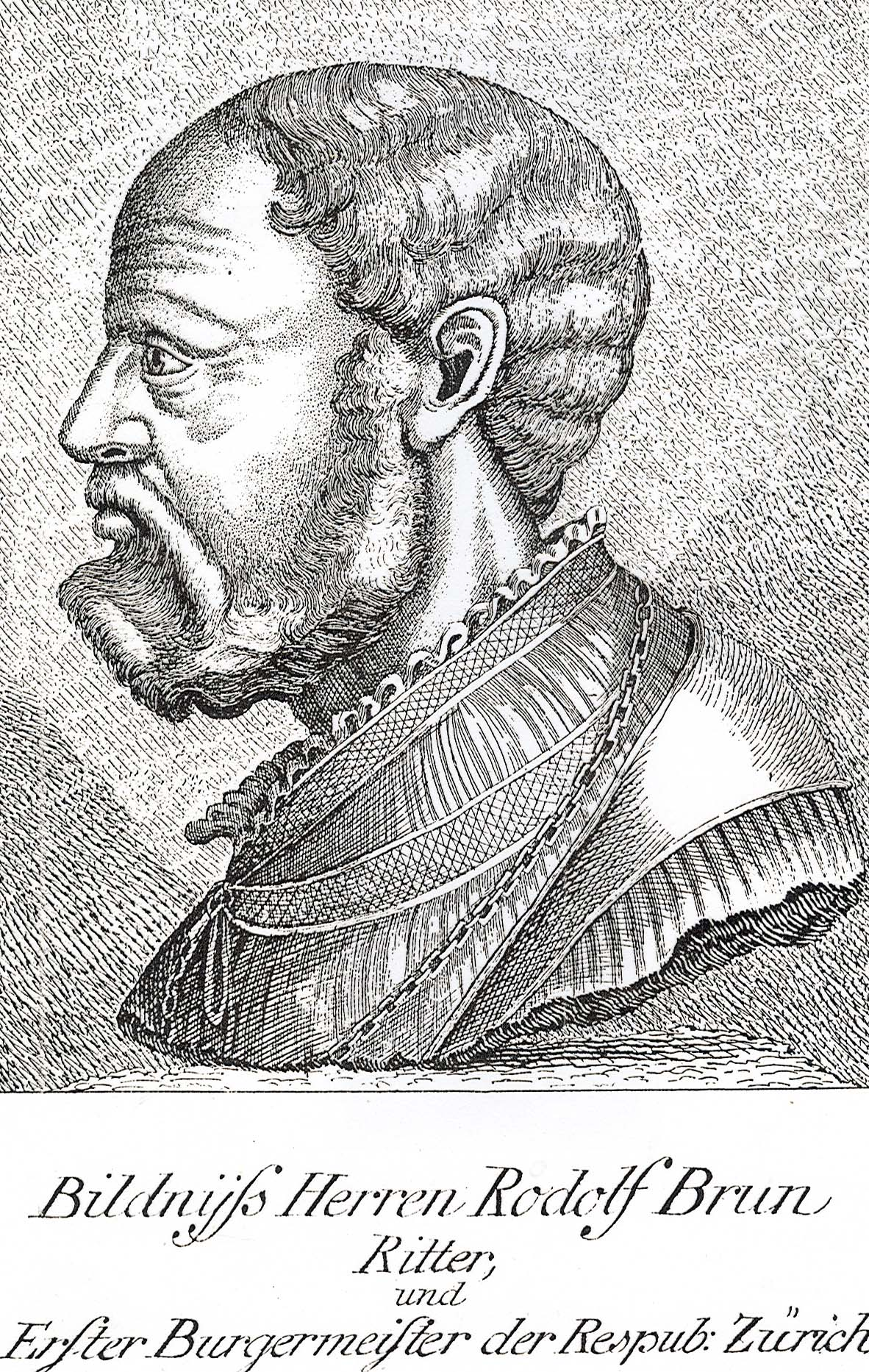
Rudolf Brun, first mayor (1336–1360)

Coat of arms of Zürich

The mayor of the Swiss city of Zürich (Stadtpräsident von Zürich) presides the city council (Stadtrat). The office of mayor (Bürgermeister) was introduced with the guild revolution of 1336, and held by Rudolf Brun until 1360. It was abolished in the Helvetic Republic (1798–1803). In 1803, the title of Bürgermeister was given to the head of the cantonal government, and the office of the city mayor was renamed to Stadtpräsident).

== Bürgermeister (1336–1798) ==
After its accession to the Swiss Confederacy in 1351, Zürich was divided in its loyalties between its alliance with the Confederacy and the ties of its patriciate to the House of Habsburg. The guilds enforced a number of concessions from the pro-Habsburg patriciate in 1373, among other things the reduction of the power of the office of the mayor. From this time, Zürich had two elected mayors, who alternately were in office for half a year. The same conflict erupted once again in the so-called "Schöno dispute" (Schöno-Handel) in 1393, in which the pro-Habsburg mayor Rudolf Schön (Schöno) was deposed by the pro-Confederate guilds and the constitution was changed again to reduce the mayor's influence.

Term	Bürgermeister	Born–died
1336–1360	Rudolf Brun	(d. 1360)
1360–1384	Rüdiger Manesse	(d. 1384)
1384	Johannes Vink	(d. 1392)
1384–1390	Rudolf Schwend	(d. 1390)
1390–1393	Rudolf Schön	(d. 1412)
1392/3	Johannes Manesse	(d. 1393)
1393	Heinrich Meiss	(d. 1427)
1393–1409	Johannes Meyer von Knonau	(d. 1409)
1409	Johannes Herter	(d. 1409)
1414/5	Pantaleon ab Inkenberg	
1415–1427	Jakob Glentner	(d. 1430)
1427–1429	Felix Manesse	(d. 1434)
1429–1434	Rudolf Stüssi	(d. 1443)
1434–1439	Rudolf Meiss	(d. 1439)
1439–1441	Jakob Schwarzmurer	
1441–1442	Johannes Schwend	
1442–1445	Heinrich Schwend	
1445–1454	Johannes Keller	
1454–1469	Rudolf von Cham	
1469–1475	Heinrich Röist	
1475–1483	Heinrich Trinkler	
1483–1489	Hans Waldmann	(1435–1489)
1489	Konrad Schwend	
1489–1499	Felix Brennwald	
1499–1502	Rudolf Escher	
1502–1505	Matthias Wyss	
1505–1510	Marx Röist	(1454–1524)
1510–1524	Felix Schmid	
1524	Heinrich Walder	
1524–1542	Diethelm Röist	
1542–1544	Johannes Haab	
1544–1557	Joh. Rudolf Lavater	
..		
1795–1798	David von Wyss	(1763–1839)

From 1803–1850 the title of Bürgermeister was held by the cantonal government, while the title of the city's mayor was changed to Stadtpräsident.

== Stadtpräsident (1803 to present) ==
Mayor of Zürich (Stadtpräsident von Zürich)
Term	Mayor	Lifespan	Party	Notes
1890–1909	Hans Konrad Pestalozzi	(1848–1909)		
1909–1917	Robert Billeter	(1857–1917)	FDP/PRD	
1917–1928	Hans Nägeli	(1865–1945)	Demokraten	
1928–1942	Emil Klöti	(1877–1963)	SPS/PSS	
1942–1944	Ernst Nobs	(1886–1957)	SPS/PSS	
1944–1949	Adolf Lüchinger	(1894–1949)	SPS/PSS	
1949–1966	Emil Landolt	(1895–1995)	FDP/PRD	
1966–1982	Sigmund Widmer	(1919–2003)	LdU	
1982–1990	Thomas Wagner	(born 1943)	FDP/PRD	
1990–2002	Josef Estermann	(born 1947)	SPS/PSS	
2002–2009	Elmar Ledergerber	(born 1944)	SPS/PSS	
2009–present	Corine Mauch	(born 1960)	SPS/PSS	

== Gallery ==
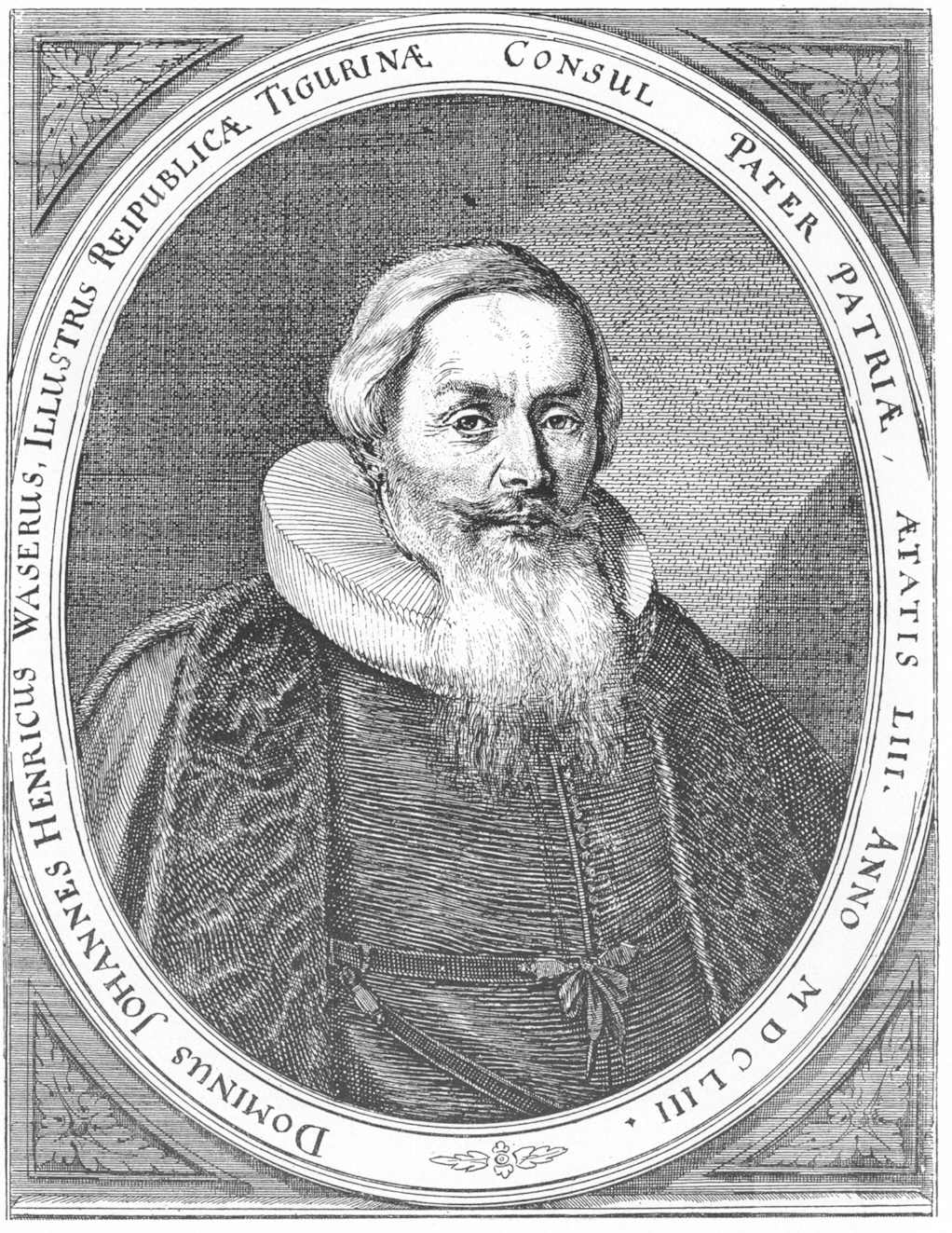
Johann Heinrich Waser

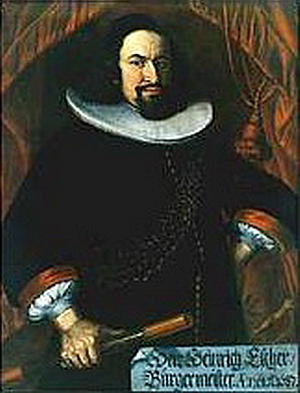
Heinrich Escher

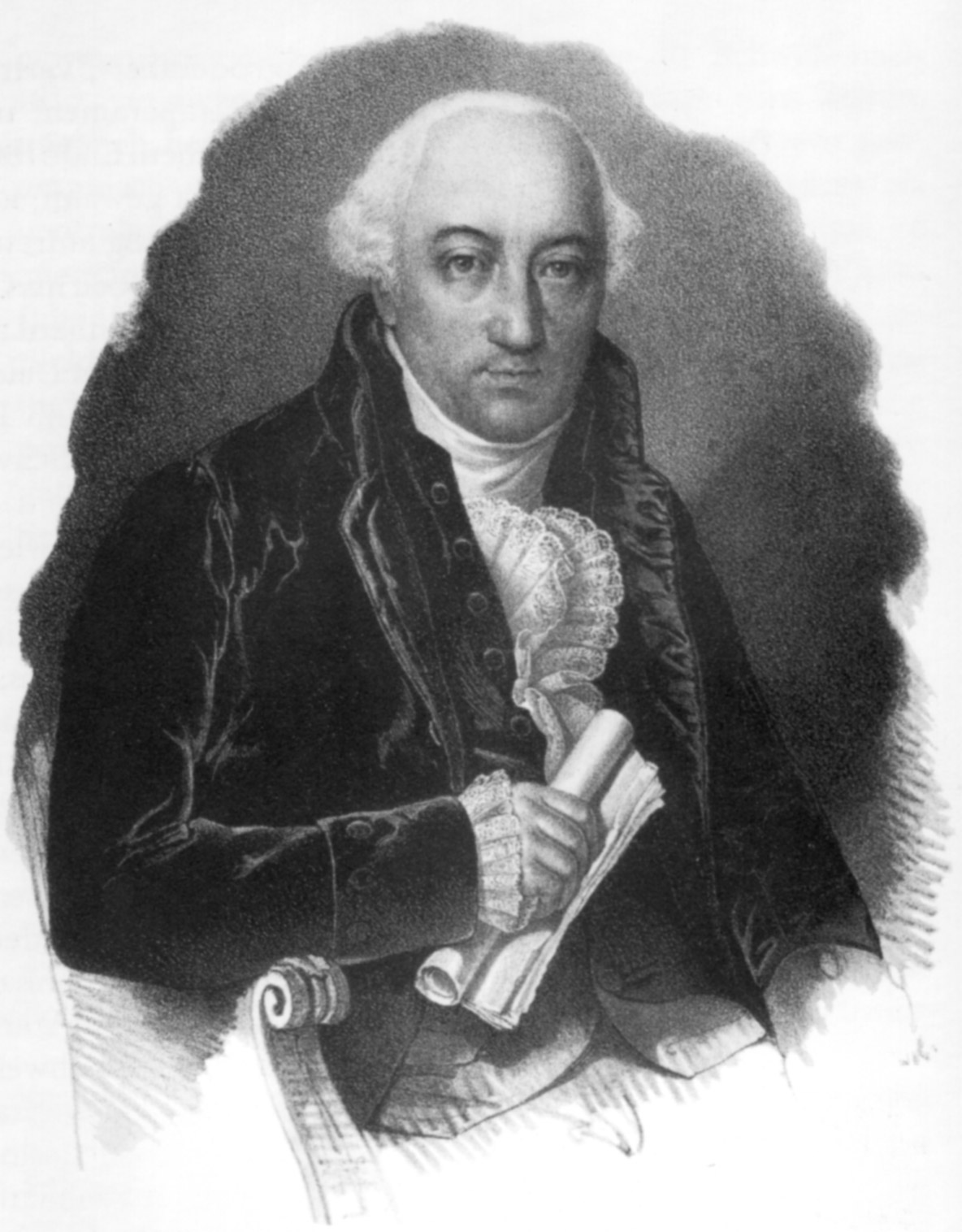
Hans von Reinhard

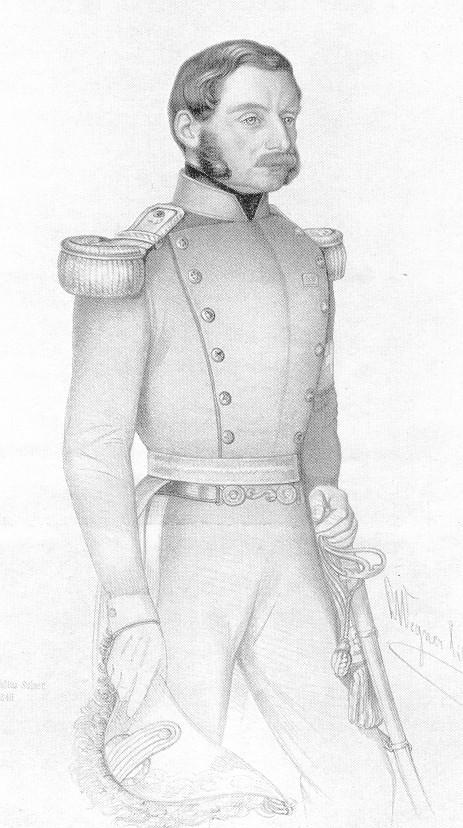
Paul Carl Eduard Ziegler (1837-1840)

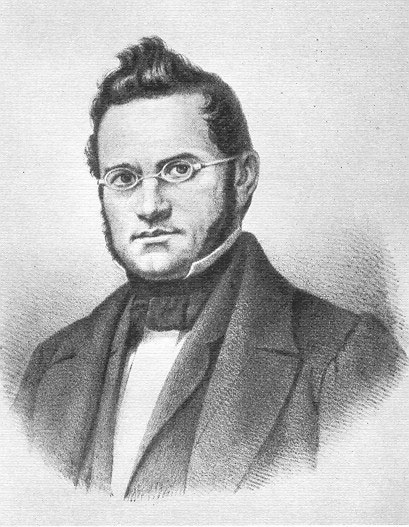
Jonas Furrer (1845-1848)

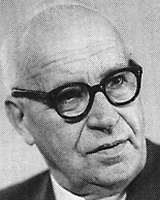
Ernst Nobs (1942-1944)

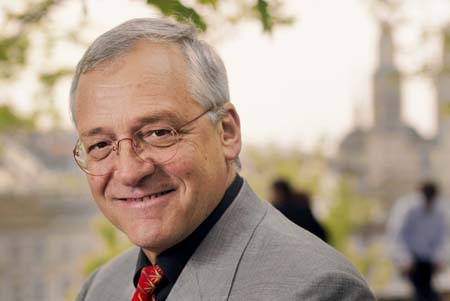
Elmar Ledergerber (2002-2009)

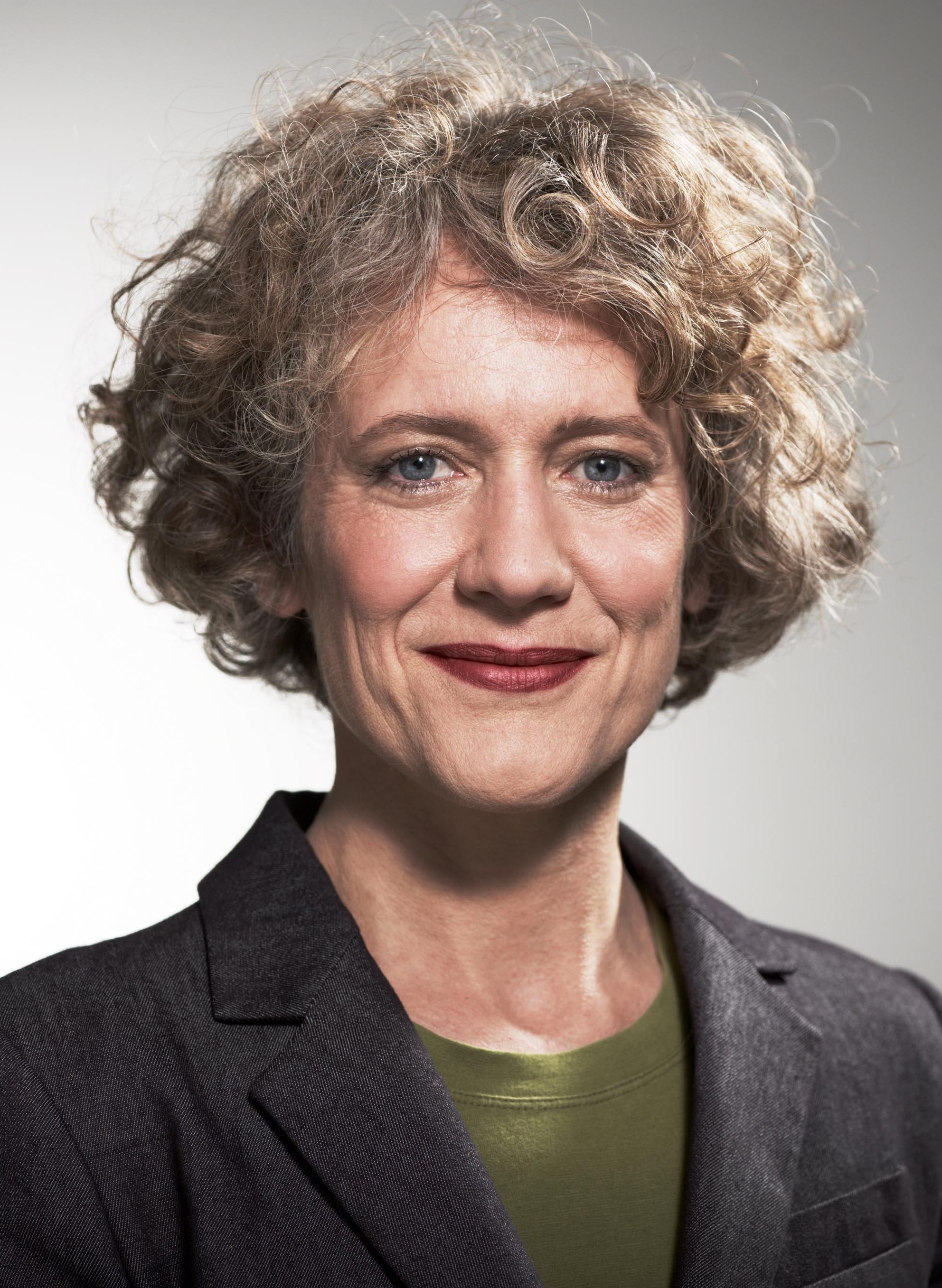
Corine Mauch, current mayor (2009)

== See also ==
- List of people from Zürich
- Timeline of Zürich
