= Treaty of Barcelona (1529) =

1529 alliance between Holy Roman Emperor Charles V and Pope Clement VII

The Treaty of Barcelona was a pact of alliance between Holy Roman Emperor Charles V and Pope Clement VII that was signed in Barcelona on June 29, 1529.

Charles V and Pope Clement VII declared their intent to bring peace to Italy and to repel the Ottoman advances. In return for Charles V's commitment to restore the Medici in Florence, Pope Clement VII restored Charles's investiture of Naples and made him receive Ravenna, Modena and Rubiera.
