= San Lorenzo Nuovo =

- Comune
- Comune di San Lorenzo Nuovo
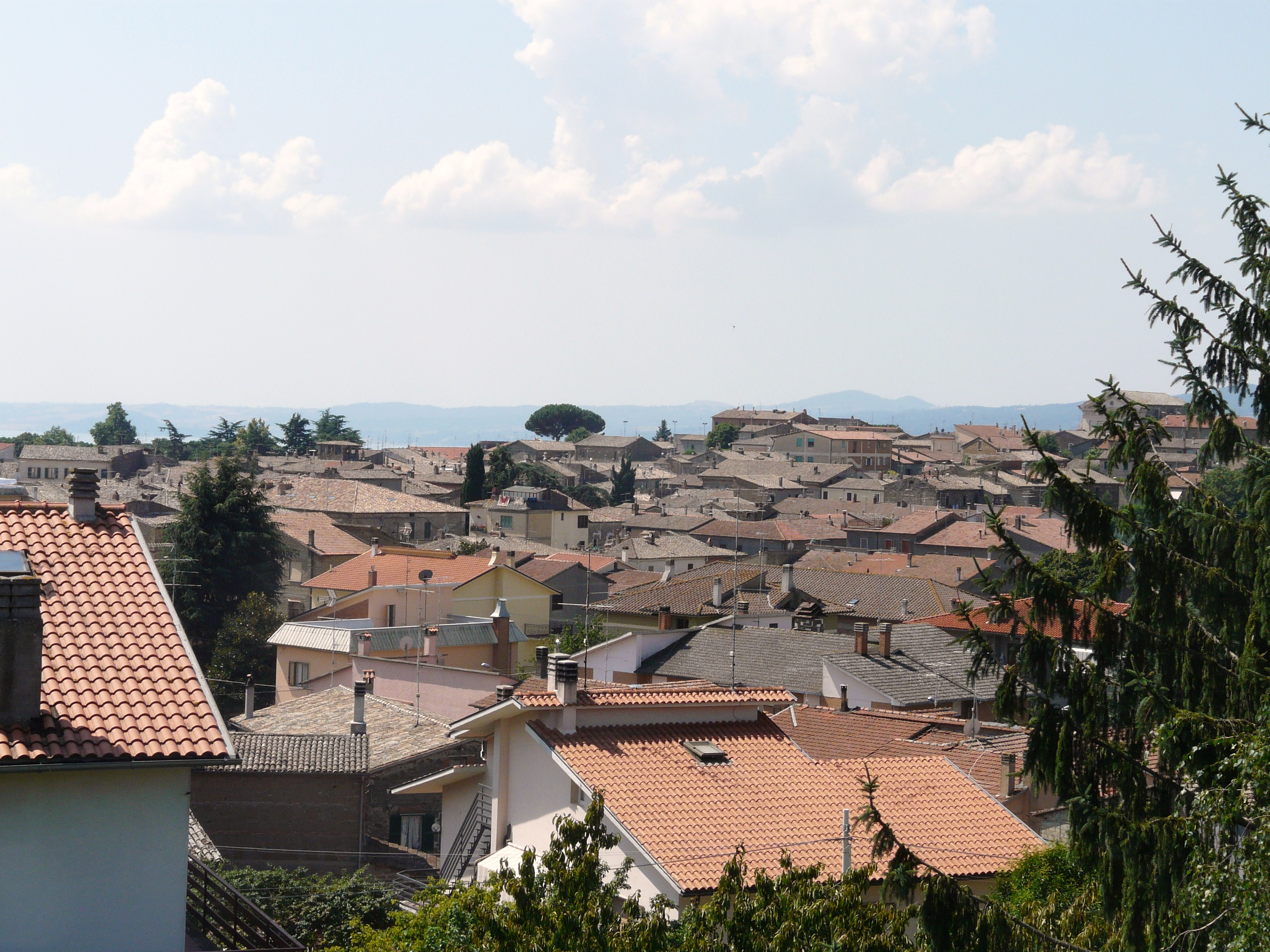

- Coat of arms

- Location within Italy Location within Lazio
- Coordinates: 42°40′N 11°54′E
- Country: Italy
- Region: Lazio
- Province: Viterbo (VT)

Government
  - Mayor: Simona Fabi

Area
  - Total: 27.99 km^{2} (10.81 sq mi)
- Elevation: 503 m (1,650 ft)

Population (31 December 2014)
  - Total: 2,109
  - Density: 75.35/km^{2} (195.2/sq mi)
- Demonym: Sanlorenzani
- Time zone: UTC+1 (CET)
  - Summer (DST): UTC+2 (CEST)
- Postal code: 01020
- Dialing code: 0763
- Patron saint: Saint Lawrence (main patron saint), Saint Apollinare (co-patron saint)
- Saint day: 10 August (Saint Lawrence), 23 July (Saint Apollinare)
- Website: Official website

San Lorenzo Nuovo is a small town and comune in the province of Viterbo, in the Latium region of Italy. It is an agricultural center producing potatoes, olive oil, garlic, onions, cereals and grapes. A second source of revenue is tourism.

== Geography ==
The town is located on the northern side of Lake Bolsena's crater rim. It dominates the lake basin on one side and the valley of the Acquapendente on the other side, at the crossing of the ancient Via Cassia (now state road 2) and the via Maremmana (state road 74). Neighbouring cities are Acquapendente, Bolsena, Castel Giorgio, Gradoli and Grotte di Castro.

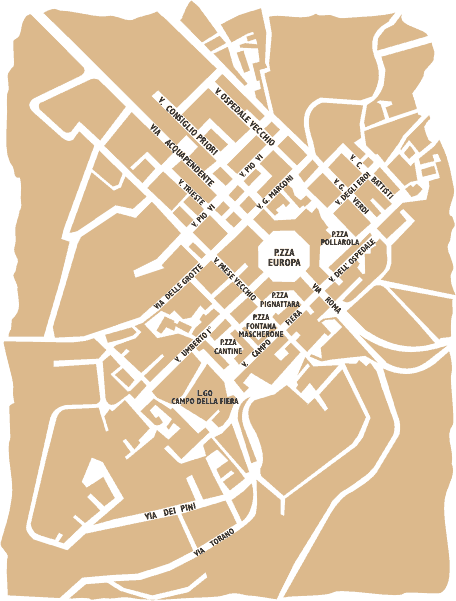
Map of San Lorenzo Nuovo.

The rock known as "Sasso della graticola" is placed to mark the border with Bolsena and Castelgiorgo. The rock bears initials S L on the side facing San Lorenzo Nuovo. San Lorenzo Nuovo is famous for the harmonious symmetry and linearity of its streets, due to Francesco Navone.

== History ==
=== The old village ===
Originally inhabited by the Etruscans, after the Roman conquest San Lorenzo was elected municipium and prefecture. According to tradition, the inhabitants had asked for protection from the heavens during the 5th-century AD invasions of the Vandals; on the feast of Saint Apollinare, a dense fog came down and the invaders spared the town. In 771–772, refugees came here from Tiro, a small centre placed on the hill of Civita (later "Svignata"), when the original Etruscan town of Grotte di Castro was destroyed by the Lombards under king Desiderius. It was in this area, according to Roman Martyrology, that Saint Christina of Bolsena would have been martyrized.

Before 1774, the old village of San Lorenzo alle Grotte was located in the lowlands closer to Lake Bolsena than the current village. This ancient hamlet was named after the numerous surrounding caves (grotte). Due to its location along the Via Cassia, in a central position for the interests of Orvieto, Viterbo and Sovana, San Lorenzo alle Grotte had been always of strategic importance and was contended for by local noblemen and the Church. In 1113 the area was donated to the Church by Matilda of Canossa, countess of Tuscany. The same area was sacked by the Holy Roman Emperor Henry VI in 1186. The opposition of Pope Celestine III, mediated by the bishop of Sovana, to the direct interference of the bishops of Orvieto over this area is recorded in a document dated 28 June 1183.

Towards 1265, together with neighbouring lands (Grotte di Castro, Latera, Gradoli, Bisentina island), the area became part of the province of Val di Lago, ruled by the Republic of Orvieto for a short time. The next year, San Lorenzo took part in the Ghibellines expedition against Martana Island and other Guelphs centres but the next year it renewed its obedience to the Church. In 1294, San Lorenzo and other centres of Val di Lago, professed submission to Orvieto. It was the beginning of a series of disputes with Pope Boniface VIII. Orvieto, once excommunicated and placed under interdict, stopped any action contrary to the Church. This was not the intention of San Lorenzo, claiming actions against Orvieto. On 20 March 1298, Boniface VIII ordered to stop all hostilities and let Orvieto's army occupy the castle of San Lorenzo. Although returned to Orvieto's jurisdiction, the centres of Val di Lago resisted paying their tribute for three years. In 1315, San Lorenzo was involved in the fights between Orvieto and the papal legate Bernard of Cluny, being defeated at Montefiascone by Guittuccio of Bisenzio. In 1318, San Lorenzo supported with 25 infantries Orvieto against Ugolinuccio de' Neri of Montemarano. In 1354, in the presence of Gil Alvarez De Albornoz, all villages of Val di Lago confirmed their submission to Orvieto. In 1359, the Republic of Orvieto was abolished and Cardinal Albornoz brought San Lorenzo again under the jurisdiction of the papacy.

In 1527, the landsknechts, on their way to Rome, burnt San Lorenzo, Bolsena and Montefiascone. An agreement was achieved between San Lorenzo and Grotte di Castro about rights and duties of land owners residing in their respective territories.

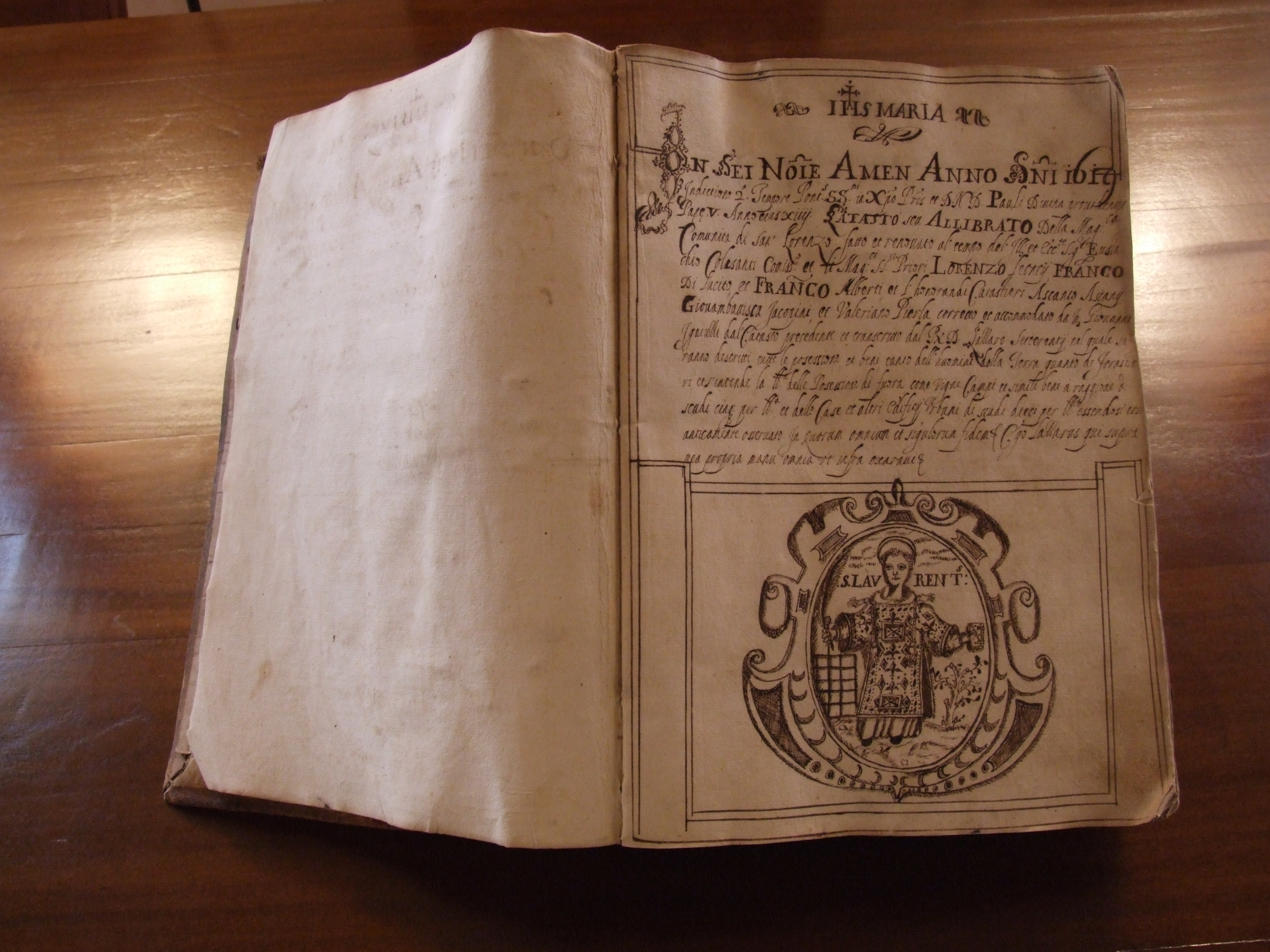
Registration ("allibrazione") of rural cadastre, 1619.

In the early 1630s, a painting of a view of San Lorenzo was produced by the visiting Flemish painter Bartholomeus Breenbergh. Known as a pastoral landscape with a citadel, an engraving by the Swiss engravers Balthasar Anton Dunker and Robert Daudet is the inverse image of Breenbergh painting.

=== The new village ===
The new town was built in 1774. The area of San Lorenzo alle Grotte was rather unhealthy, as acknowledged by the marble frame kept in the central square of the new town. People were affected by malaria and other epidemics, and trade had ceased. Cardinal Giovanni Angelo Braschi, future Pope Pius VI, at the time when he was apostolic treasurer, after the many failures in trying to decontaminate the area, induced Pope Clement XIV to take the decision to move all homes from the hollow, unhealthy areas by the lake to a higher and more liveable place, in order to be safe from the frequent floods which hit the plains. An area was identified on a wide upland in the vicinity of the old village (in a location named Gabelletta) and next brought on mandate of the Reverend Apostolic Chamber. Initially, with a signed document dated 3 June 1772, Pope Clement XIV commissioned the work of reconstruction to architect Alessandro Dori and then to architect Francesco Navone, who designed a sort of ideal city according to urban planning canons of his time.

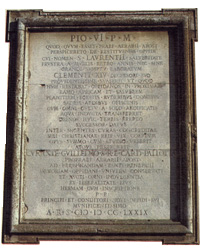
Marble frame placed in Piazza Europa.

Once Pope, Pius VI made efforts to have the works completed and entrusted to Cardinal Guglielmo Pallotta, vice apostolic treasurer, the carrying out of the works. The original route of Via Cassia was modified, leaving the old village completely isolated. Water was brought and the village of San Lorenzo Nuovo was founded. The parish, the central square, the Governor's Palace (then Palazzo Comunale), and a few buildings housing about 300 people were in place in 1777. As a sign of gratitude, two years later the citizens created and put on view a marble frame in memory of the saviour and founder of the new town.

On 22–23 February 1798 on his way to Florence as prisoner of the French, Pius VI had the opportunity to stop by San Lorenzo Nuovo for an address to the population. On 10 August 1929, a memorial stone was placed on the house of family Pacetti, to commemorate the visit of the prisoner pope. Bands of Giuseppe Garibaldi's followers crossed into the Papal States in September 1867 and came into fights with the Papal Zouaves. On the territory of San Lorenzo Nuovo, Monte Landro was the theatre of the defeat of Garibaldi's men.

In May–June 1944, in the course of World War II, San Lorenzo Nuovo suffered aerial bombardment by Allied forces, with numerous casualties and substantial damages.

In April–May 2006, to celebrate 500 years in the line of duty a group of veteran Swiss Guards marched from Switzerland, stopping in San Lorenzo Nuovo on their way to Rome.

== Main sights ==
=== Piazza Europa ===
Road Cassia, over the tract between Acquapendente and Bolsena, at km 124, crosses through an octagonal square, just in front of the parish church of San Lorenzo Martire. This is the centre of San Lorenzo Nuovo, Piazza Europa, a wide square regarded as an interesting example of 18th century urban planning.

The artist Francesco Navone adopted an innovative technique meant to create the plan of the new town in the style of Copenhagen Amalienborg square. A sign of the originality of Navone's project was also the uniformity of the buildings. Little differences can be noticed between the nobles' and the common people's houses, the only exception being San Lorenzo Martire, which stands out of the other buildings for its considerable height.

=== Collegiate church of San Lorenzo Martire ===
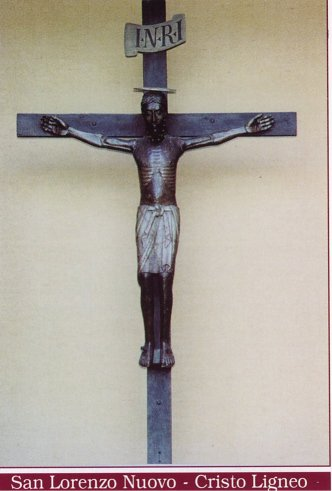
Byzantine wooden crucifix, 12th century.

The 34-metre (112 ft) height parish church of San Lorenzo Martire dominates Piazza Europa. Surrounded by numerous ex-voto, a crucifix is kept in its fine chapel. It is a 12th-century Byzantine statue made of polychrome wood. On 12 October 1778 it was escorted in a solemn procession from the old village to the new church. The crucifix has been venerated ever since.

Two mannerist canvases of Jacopo Zucchi, representing the Ascension and Resurrection are housed in the church. Originally constructed by Cardinal Aragona for his private chapel in Vatican, they were donated to the town by Pope Pius VI in 1777. Behind the altar, a painting by the Filippo Bracci depicts the Martyrdom of Saint Lawrence and Saint Apollinare with the Virgin Mary and child (1779). Remains of Saint Apollinare, the town's co-patron, together with the ones of Saint Lawrence and Saint Stephen, were supposedly found in ancient altar and re-entombed in the sepulcher donated by Acaste Bresciani to the new altar in 1938. The Triumph of Saint Lawrence in the apse of the church is a tempera paint composition of Testa (1940). Valuable artworks are preserved in the parish buildings. An example is the San Carlo Borromeo signed by the Italian painter Tommaso Aloysio Juvarra (1809–1875).

=== Church of Capuchin Fathers ===
The church of Capuchin Fathers, is a single nave building with three lateral chapels on each side. Corso Umberto I, ideally equivalent to the Royal street of Copenhagen, is a straight street connecting Piazza Europa to the church of Capuchin Fathers. The church was completed in 1784, and dedicated to a Capuchin friar, Saint Seraphim of Montegranaro. The interiors were finely decorated by the Sicilian Capuchin friar, painter and littérateur, Fidelis of San Biagio (1717–1801). He painted: Immaculate Conception with Saint Seraphim of Montegranaro, Saint Francis receiving stigmata, martyrdom of Saint Fidelis of Sigmaringen, ecstasy of Saint Lawrence of Brindisi, Sacred Family with Saint Felix of Cantalice, martyrdom of Saint Joseph of Leonessa. The painting representing the blessed Bernard of Corleone was lost during World War II. At present, the church is dedicated to the Assumption of Mary. Built in the early 18th century, it was part of a convent of the Capuchin Fathers until 1810, when all religious orders were suppressed by Napoleon I.

In 1997, the church housed a photo exhibition depicting the history of the Shroud of Turin.

=== Church of Torano ===
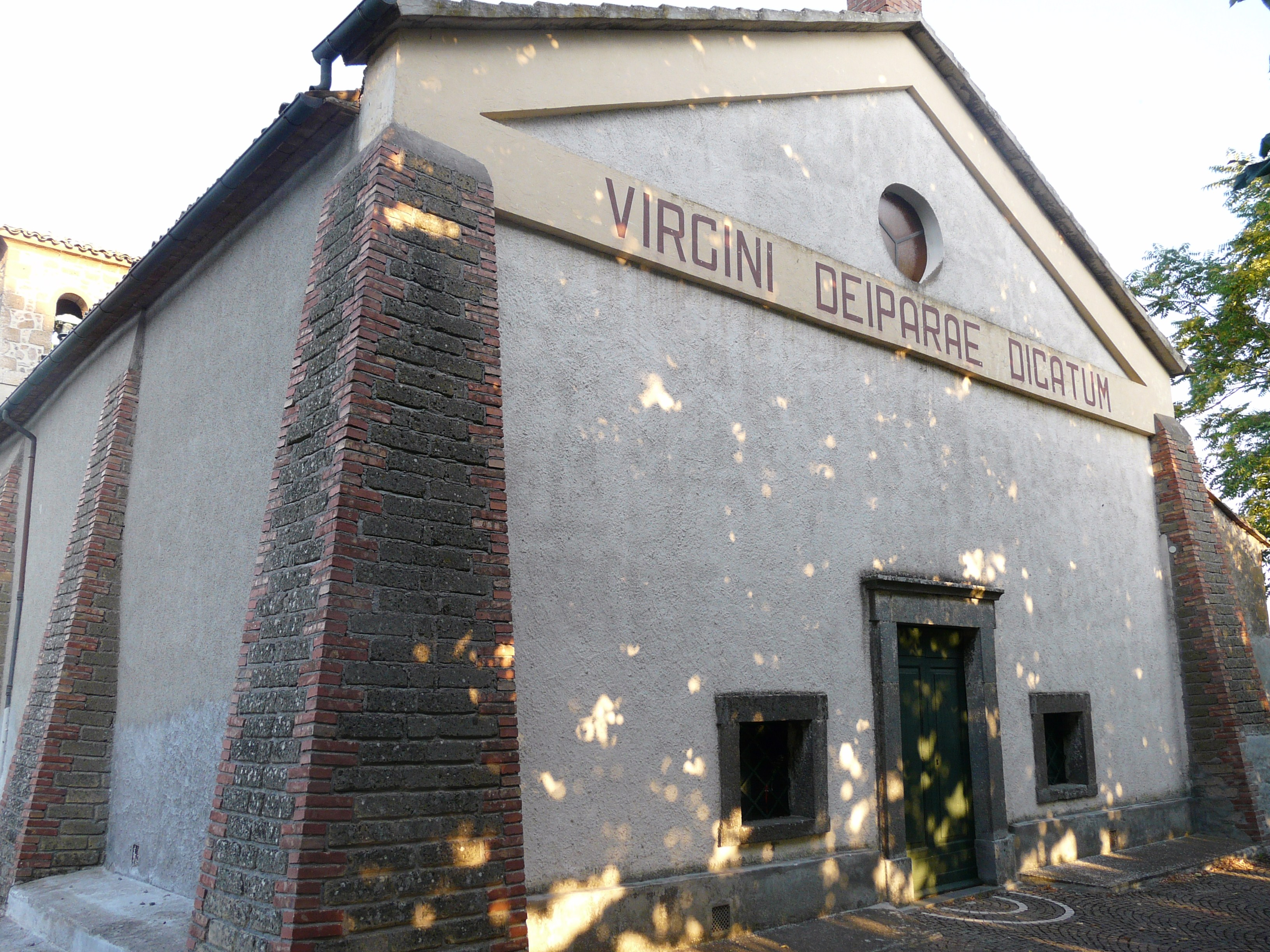
Church of Torano.

The neighbouring areas feature the noticeable church of Torano, probably built after an Etruscan temple (Tyranus ager). The Virgin Mary "Turan" was honored here, named after the Etruscan goddess Turan (ruines of an Etruscan worship area were found close to the church).

The building has a simple gabled facade in whose frieze stands the dedication: VIRGINI DEIPARAE DICATUM ("DEDICATED TO THE VIRGIN MOTHER OF GOD").

The only entrance door is flanked by two small windows, from which, even when the church is closed, visitors can take a look inside for a prayer or to leave a flower on the windowsill. In the eye of the pediment there is a stained glass window with the image of the Madonna. The rustic bell tower is made of tufa ashlars. Inside, the hall is plastered in white, the arches of the side chapels are in excellent handmade red tuff and the presbytery is decorated with floral motifs and architectural elements in faux marble. The nave is covered by a sail vault; the presbytery, instead, by a cross vault. From the polychrome stained-glass window of the oculus of the apse, where the monogram of Mary's name surmounted by a royal crown stands out, a warm and dazzling light enters on sunny days.

The church houses an Umbrian-Latin school fresco of the Virgin Mary on the throne, with the sweetest face and the blessing Christ Child naked on his mother's knees and a carnation to the right, dating back to the 15th century (likely 1475). The Holy Trinity (top part) and the holy martyrs Agata and Apolonnia are also painted in the same fresco (valuable work by an artist of the 16th century. From the tympanum, the Holy Trinity blesses the pilgrims.

Based on the memories of his Lordship Acaste Bresciani, the church is probably the remainder of an ancient Benedictine monastery. Half-size small, it was expanded in 1875 thanks to Reverend Eugenio Licca and donations and voluntary works by the population. The current face of the sacred building is mainly due to the work carried out in 1986 by the parish priest Pompeo Rossi. The Florentine terracotta floor and the buttresses supporting the vaults were made, the bell tower was consolidated, the apse walls were decorated (Ennio Luzzi, died on 30 October 1999) and a new basalt altar was consecrated with a terracotta frontal by Mario Vinci (died on 20 November 2018), depicting the Nativity of Mary.

The feast of Our Lady of Torano is celebrated on 8 September. Godmothers of the feast are the "Ladies of Torano", three 16-year-old girls who are elected every year on Ascension Day by lot.

=== Church of San Giovanni in Val di Lago ===
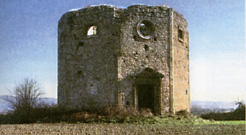
Church of San Giovanni in Val di Lago.

Near to the lake, between San Lorenzo Nuovo and Bolsena, are ruins of the church of San Giovanni in Val di Lago (destroyed by the earthquake of 30 May 1563). The area, also known as "Civita di Grotte di Castro", was used until 1799 to host the yearly celebrations of Saint John the Baptist on 24 June. The octagonal church, dedicated to Saint John the Baptist, was rebuilt in 1563 by the architect Pietro Tartarino, an apprentice of Alberto da Sangallo. Stuccos by Ferrando Fancello are no longer present here.

=== Park of the Grottoes ===
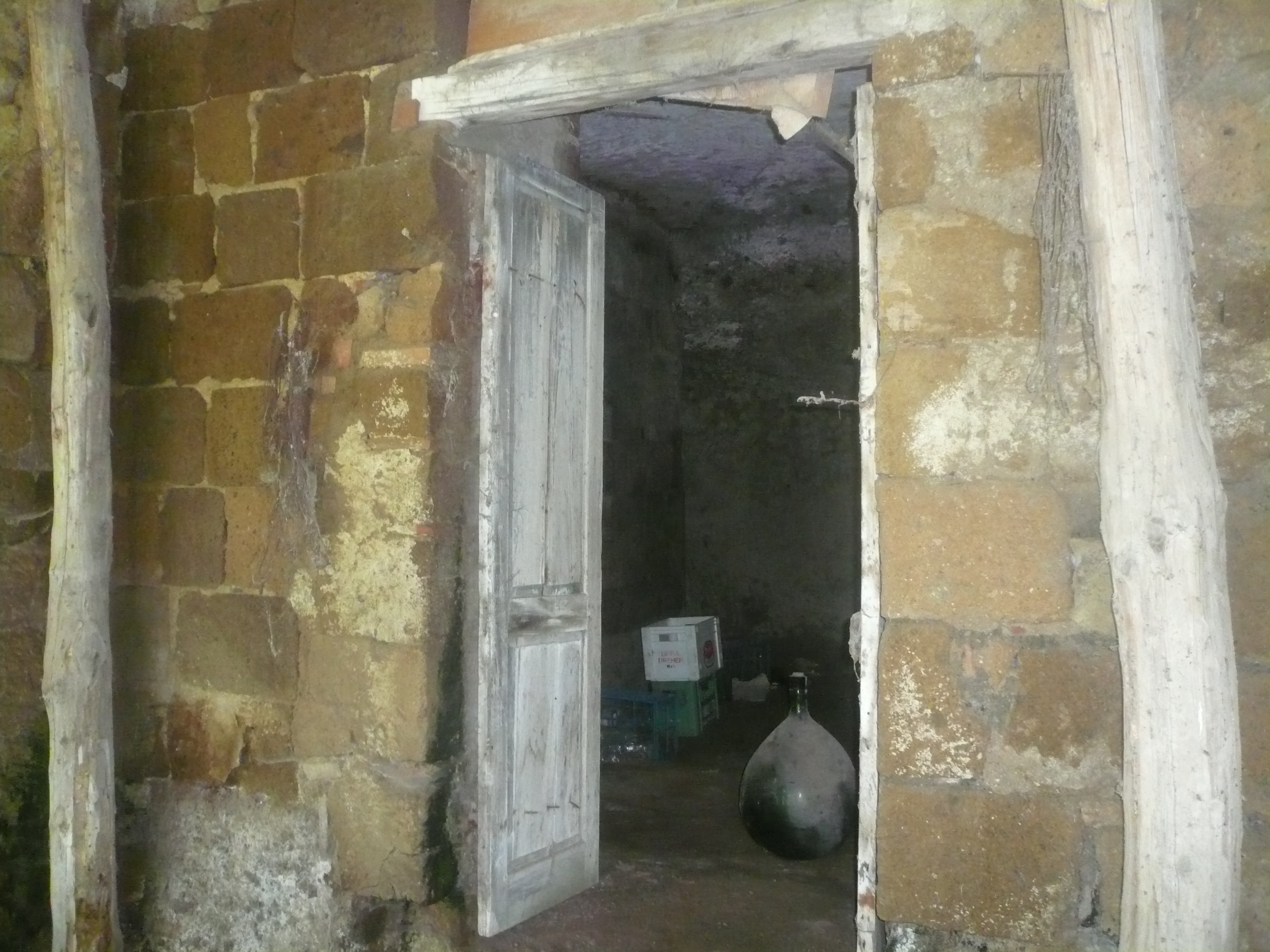
Grotto in the ancient settlement of San Lorenzo alle Grotte.

It is known with this name (Parco delle Grotte) a vast area covering 1,310 hectares (3,200 acres) over most of the ancient settlement of San Lorenzo alle Grotte (and a small area of the commune of Grotte di Castro). The area extends northwards from the Lake Bolsena borders up towards the Vulsini volcanic caldera margin. The minimum elevation is at 300 metres (980 ft) above sea level (lake border) and the maximum at 584 metres (1,916 ft) on (Monte Landro), with a difference in level of 284 metres (932 ft). The zone is characterized by the presence of several grottoes and cavities excavated in the tuff. The biggest one is of regular shape, with a length of about 30 metres (98 ft). Two visit centres are meant to be located in the park: centre San Lazzaro along the Via Cassia at km 122, and centro Paese Vecchio near the ancient village. The Park is part of the Territorial Museum of Lake Bolsena, supported by Lazio Region and Viterbo Province.

=== The Brigands' path ===
During the 19th century the area across Latium, Umbria and Tuscany marked the southern border of the Grand Duchy of Tuscany and, since 1861 the Kingdom of Italy and the States of the Church. The area included woodlands such as Selva del Lamone and Monti di Castro, with isolated caves and small rivers out of the main roads. Several brigands used to live here. One of the latest brigands of northern Latium, in action at the end of the 19th century when the area became part of the Kingdom of Italy, was Fortunato Ansuini. He was as cruel as anybody else. The most influential brigand of the zone was Domenico Tiburzi, who was called Domenichino, and was known as the King of Lamone, or the Robin Hood of Maremma. He always refused to come into alliance with Ansuini because he considered him no more than a common outlaw. Born at Norcia in 1844 from a family of farmers, Ansuini was forced by parents to work as a stonemason. He killed a man in a tavern and was sentenced to 11 years in prison in Rome. In May 1866, together with three jail-mates, he escaped through a drain. The fugitives left Rome and chose Maremma as a secure place for their furtiveness. Here, their new life had a start, made of robberies and racketeering to get weapons, bullets, and money. The gendarmes were on their traces and forced them to continuously move from one place to another, without capturing them for a long time. The soldiers could identify them with the help of a spy, and caught them while banqueting inside a cave. The outlaws surrendered soon.

In April 1890, Ansuini was locked up in the fort Filippo II to the Monte Argentario. Again, he arranged for an escape together with other captives. Breaking off the chains that were keeping them blocked, they went out through the window with the help of bed sheets. The next night the brigands stormed a shepherd house near Capalbio, tied up the shepherds and raided food, money, weapons, and bullets. The bloodthirsty brigand Damiano Menichetti was part of the group. He came soon into close alliance with Ansuini, whilst the others left them.

Several anecdotes are known about Ansuini. He liked to mock the gendarmes, leaving signed fliers in the same restaurants where he used to eat. Once he went elegantly dressed to Bassano in Teverina and entered the barracks of carabinieri in the name of a trade man on travel from Milan. On his request, he had an escort of two gendarmes, for personal protection during his journey. At the end he asked the two men to deliver a flyer to their commander. It came about that the commander expressed all his anger when he read the paper with the signature of Ansuini. The phenomenon of brigandage was close to being extinguished. Ansuini disappeared after a fight with carabinieri. Menichetti was captured after killing the brigadier Sebastiano Preta, and died in prison.

The Brigands' Path is an historical hiking trail that follows in the footsteps of some of Italy's infamous notorious figures. It is a 120-kilometre (75 mi) trail that links the Tyrrhenian Sea (area of Vulci) to the Apennine Mountains of central Italy. A trail is marked in the area across Onano, Grotte di Castro, Gradoli and San Lorenzo Nuovo where the adventures of Ansuini and other brigands set their stage.

== Events ==
=== Sagra degli Gnocchi ===
Firstly introduced in the 1970s as a celebration of potato as the main local agricultural produce, the Gnocchi's Festival (in Italian, Sagra degli Gnocchi) is a typical mid-August event in San Lorenzo Nuovo. The town's main square is transformed into a large, open-air restaurant where the visitors can taste potato gnocchi, and other typical local recipes such as pigskin beans, tripe, and roasted sausages. A special atmosphere is created by liscio and rock orchestras in the context of cultural, sporting and religious (patron saint day and Assumption of Mary) events.

=== Sanlorenziadi ===
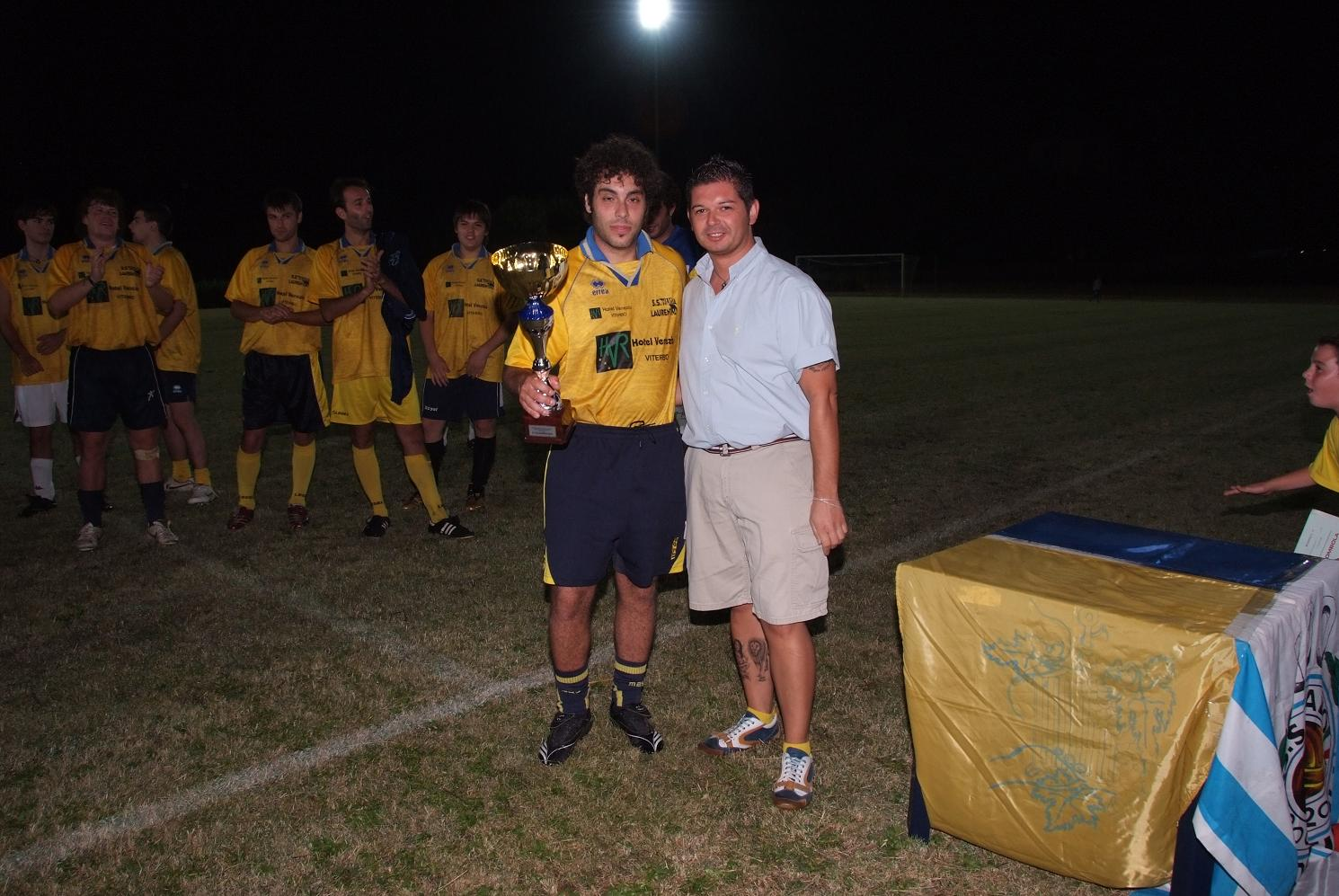
Sanlorenziadi edition 2008, Memorial Cimpella.

The term 'sanlorenziadi' (literally Olympic games of San Lorenzo Nuovo) refers to non-professional sporting and game competitions opposing the "yiellows" (from the colour of the contrade 'Pergolino', located eastern side from Via Cassia) to the "blues" (from the colour of the contrade 'Convento', located western side from Via Cassia). The town's central square is the main site of public games. Discontinuously taking place since the 1980s (1984, 1988, 1989, 1990, 1994, 1995), sanlorenziadi is a typical summer event. Originated from the long lasting tradition of football match Pergolino-Convento (since 2000 memorial "Antonio Cimpella"), it consists of an array of sporting competitions combined with popular games. A magnificent inaugural happening precedes the games, which attracts visitors and spectators. The summer 2007 games (21 July – 5 August), won by Pergolino, were organized by the local cultural association 'Scacciapensieri'. Sanlorenziadi edition 2008 (18 July – 3 August), jointly organized by 'Scacciapensieri' and 'Associazione Culturale Giovani Laurentini', was also won by Pergolino. As well, Pergolino won edition 2009, organized by 'Associazione Culturale Giovani Laurentini', and edition 2010. The 2011 edition was not played and was the occasion of an 'old glories' football match (won by Pergolino). Convento won the 2012 edition.

=== 17 January, Saint Anthony the Abbot ===
Yearly celebration of Sant'Anthony the Abbot is a typical farming feast, characterized by blessing of the animals, distribution of faba bean soup, show of chariots and animals, and snack with anchovies, Saint Anthony "biscuit" and wine.

=== 24 June, Saint John Baptist ===
The fair of Saint John is a popular event whose origin dates back to 1563, when allegedly St. John the Baptist appeared in front of a farmer requesting to rebuild a church on the spot where ruins of an earlier church had stood. The population met the request and the above-mentioned church of San Giovanni in Val di Lago, San Lorenzo Nuovo, a ruin now, was built. This yearly fair commemorating this event goes on the entire day of 24 June all around the central square. The 2020 edition was particular in that the need to comply with anti-COVID regulations made it appropriate to identify a different location than usual: the location of Vignolo was considered the most suitable for size, logistics and landscape and 1624 entrance tickets were issued. Until the 19th century, the same fair had been having place near lake Bolsena, in the area of the church of San Giovanni in Val di Lago.

The transit started the day before and went on all night. It was a biblical exodus of herds of oxen and horses coming from the Maremma, wagons loaded with all kinds of merchandise, chickens tied for the legs of poor beasts in bunches like onions, rabbits in cages, chicks of all species of poultry, passed the endless flocks of sheep, pigs in packs and isolated. There were the sellers of goats, bigons and barrels, there were the charcoal-eaters with varieties of all kinds, things of land, air, sea and fresh water, those who had a colt or calf to sell, those who had nothing to sell but only to buy, men and women and even brats passed by.

At night he moaned, grunted, grunted, grunted, grunted, bleated, squealed, and talked of course and loudly, but it was a time of hard work and heavy sleep. The roosters, though in an uncomfortable and reluctant position, but perhaps it was a cry of protest, sang at all hours. It was a travesty of hoofs, a creaking of wheels, a rubbing of paws and feet tired of villainy. The dust followed that frayed procession, and when the sun came up and down, there remained a biblical shambles, also biblical, and an indefinable stench of manure mixture.

Everyone went to San Giovanni in Val di Lago for the great fair of the twenty-fourth of June, the most important fair there was in that period from the sea to the mountains...

=== 10–11 August, Saint Lawrence Martyr ===
San Lorenzo Nuovo was named after the patron Saint Lawrence, martyr. Every year, on 10 August a solemn procession marks the highlight of the occasion according to a longstanding tradition. Moving from the parochial church, the procession carries the statue of the Saint through the village streets. The next day, a traditional fair takes place.

=== 15 August, Assumption of the Virgin Mary ===
The Assumption of Mary is celebrated every year by a procession in which the statue of Mary is carried from the church of Capuchin Fathers in the neighbour streets.

=== 8 September, Virgin Mary "Turan" ===
"Madonna di Torano" is celebrated every year according to a secular tradition. On 8 September, the so-called "Ladies of Turan" protagonize the event. They are three 16-year-old girls selected as godmothers of the feast. In the morning, they use to take off until they reach the rural church of Turan (about 1.5 km away from the centre). In the afternoon, convivial events take place in the area of the church.

=== 14 September, Exaltation of the Holy Cross ===
According to an ancient popular tradition, the wooden crucifix dating back to the 12th century and housed in the parochial church is object of deep veneration. Every year a religious procession is celebrated on 14 September (feast of the Very Holy Cross), but it is only every 15 years (probably since 1787) that a solemn procession takes place on the same day carrying the cross through the village streets finely decked for the occasion. This procession, celebrated in memory of the transfer of the statue from the old village to the parochial church of the new municipium (12 October 1778), is joined by the people, the representatives of the local authorities, the local band, the SS. Crocifisso Brotherhood, the flag-wavers with a parade of the historical cortege. An array of events, collectively known as "Festone" (Big Feast), span over the summer months with traditional feasts and other forms of merriment. The Festone was lastly celebrated in 2012. In 2000, on the occasion of the Great Jubilee, both civil and religious authorities took the decision for an exceptional procession, out of the habitual festivities.

== Famous citizens ==
- Lorenzo Cozza, friar Minor, cardinal and theologian
- Acaste Bresciani, Roman Catholic priest and author

== See also ==
- Fanum Voltumnae
- Gianni Bellocchi
- Edith Fischhof Gilboa (Israeli writer interned in San Lorenzo Nuovo during World War II)
