= Madonna di Loreto, Leonessa =

Church in Lazio, Italy

Coordinates: 42°34′11.2″N 12°57′43.0″E

Madonna di Loreto (Our Lady of Loreto) is a Roman Catholic church and convent located on Via Francesco Crispi just outside of the core of the town of Leonessa, province of Rieti, region of Lazio, central Italy.

== History ==
In 1520, the nobleman Cristoforo Gizzi donated to the Capitolo Lateranense some lands and property for them to build a church dedicated to Santa Maria di Loreto. In 1534, the heirs of Cristoforo donated the church to the Capuchin order, and under the local patronage of Matteo Silvestri, who had joined the order of friars, they opened a hospital for poor and indigent. For decades there was a debate about building a convent at the site. In 1571, the priors of the town had the monks donate the church to the commune. In 1612 the abbot of the convent at Amatrice, sent to this convent some relics of St Joseph of Leonessa, including his heart, a vial of his blood, clothes, and other sundry property of the saint. These were housed in an armory in the Sacristy, guarded by three locks to which one was owned by the capuchin monks, the second by a prior, and the third by a secretary of the Farnese family. By 1615, the convent was completed in the present state.

In 1866, the convent and the proper were expropriated by the state and ceded to the Commune. The monastery was then sold to the Capuchins, while the adjacent fields were used as a cemetery. Between the years 1960-1980s, the monastery was refurbished. The portico to the church was added in 1989.

The interior of a single nave contains a few artworks:

- Apse frescoes depict the Madonna di Loreto
- Madonna (18th-century) by followers of Carlo Maratta in third chapel on right
- Pietà (18th-century) by Giovanni Francesco da Brescia
- St Bernardo da Corleone praying to Virgin with putti
