= Castel Viscardo =

- Comune
- Comune di Castel Viscardo
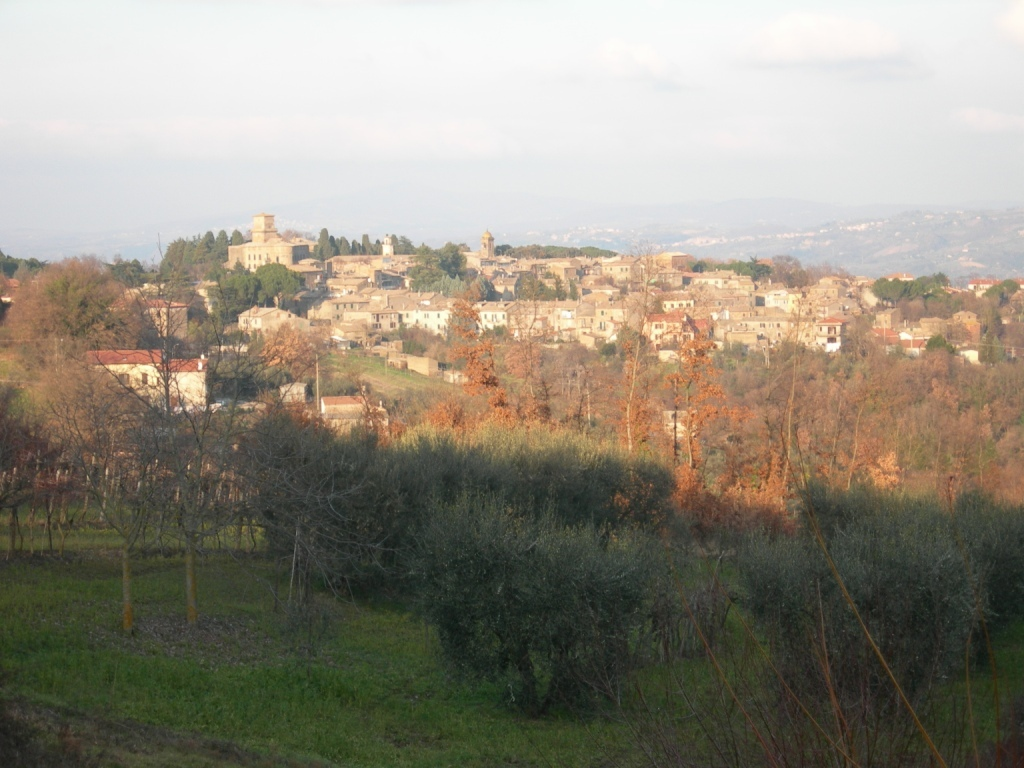
- View of Castel Viscardo

- Location within Italy Location within Umbria
- Coordinates: 42.755522°N 12.00158°E
- Country: Italy
- Region: Umbria
- Province: Terni (TR)

Government
  - Mayor: Daniele Longaroni

Area
  - Total: 26.25 km^{2} (10.14 sq mi)
- Elevation: 507 m (1,663 ft)

Population (1 January 2025)
  - Total: 2,649
  - Density: 100.9/km^{2} (261.4/sq mi)
- Demonym: Castellesi
- Time zone: UTC+1 (CET)
  - Summer (DST): UTC+2 (CEST)
- Postal code: 05014
- Dialing code: 0763
- Patron saint: Anthony of Padua
- Saint day: 27 August
- Website: Official website

Castel Viscardo is a comune (municipality) in the Province of Terni in the Italian region Umbria. The town lies about 60 km southwest of Perugia and about 35 km northeast of Terni.

== History ==
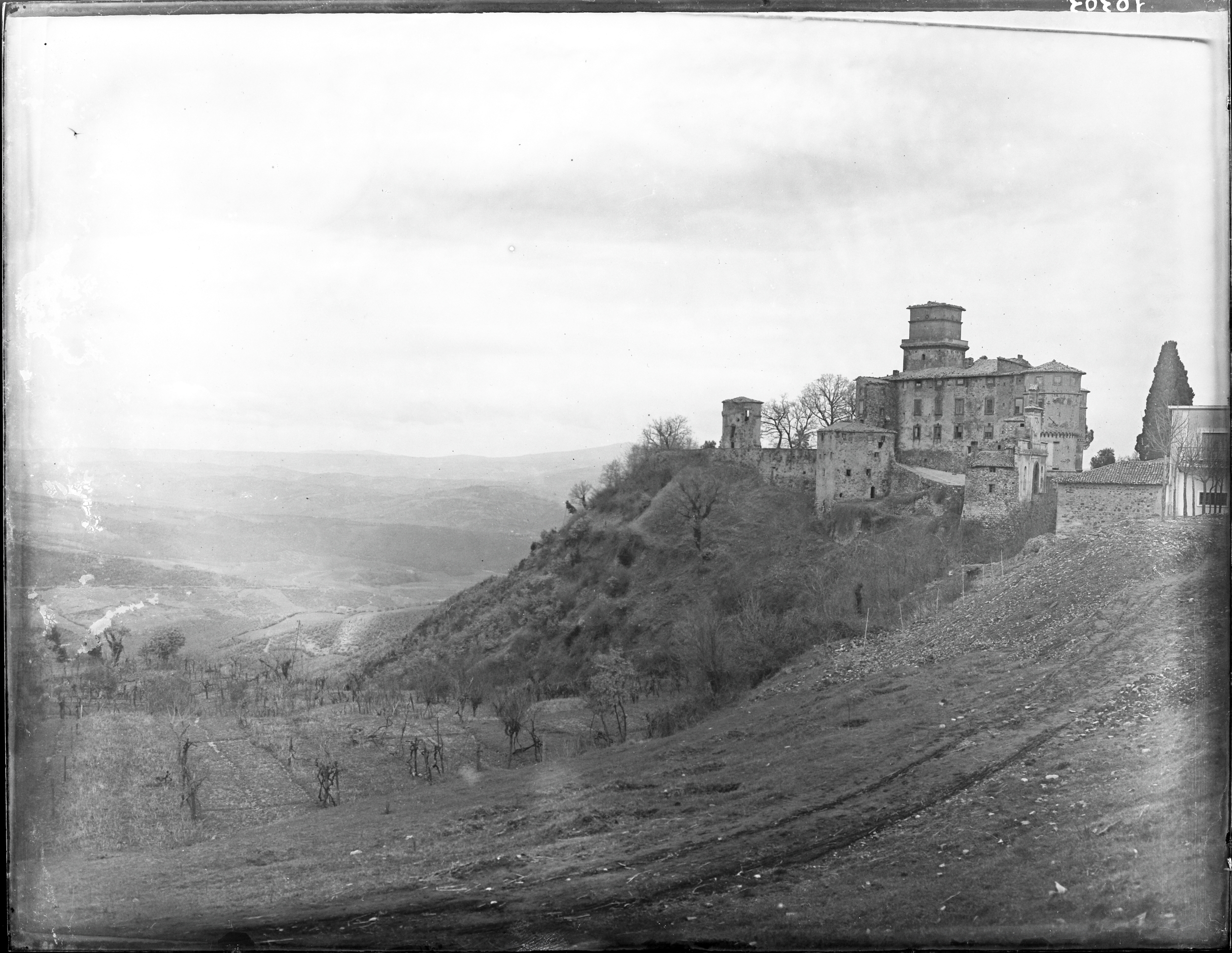
Castel Viscardo in the early 20th century

The area of Castel Viscardo shows evidence of an Etruscan presence from the 6th century BC, with a necropolis at Caldane and widespread habitation across the territory. Settlement continued in the Roman period, favored by proximity to the Via Cassia and the Traiana Nova.

The present settlement of Castel Viscardo was founded in 1263 by Guiscardo di Pietrasanta, nephew of Pope Urban IV. During the medieval period it functioned as a strategic watchpoint, with towers controlling the Paglia River Valley in the defense of Orvieto.

A fortress recorded in 1350 under the name Castello di Madonna belonged to Antonia, wife of Bonifacio Ranieri. In the late 14th century the settlement passed by marriage to the Monaldeschi della Cervara family, who held it for about two centuries.

Around 1600 feudal control passed to the Roman Veralli family for several decades. During the 17th century it was transferred by marriage to the Spada Veralli family, whose possession lasted until 1921.

According to alternative records, in 1701 Castel Viscardo was a feudal domain of the Marquis Spada, a status which it is recorded as retaining in 1803 under the Prince Spada. By 1816, it belonged to Prince Don Giuseppe Spada.

In the late 18th century Castel Viscardo was included in the Department of Trasimeno under Napoleonic rule. It was recognized in 1816 as a baronial locality within the district of Orvieto, and in 1817 became a dependent settlement of Castel Giorgio, with Orvieto as administrative seat. In 1858 it was established as a municipality under the province of Orvieto, with Viceno as a dependent hamlet.

In the mid-19th century Castel Viscardo had a population of 740 inhabitants. Of these, 556 lived within the town and 184 in the surrounding countryside.

In September 1860 Castel Viscardo was liberated from papal rule by Captain Luigi Masi and volunteers from the Tiber area. In 1879 its territory was expanded through the annexation of Monte Rubiaglio after the suppression of that municipality.

In 1898 a dispute opposed villagers claiming customary rights and Prince Spada. The conflict led to trials and violence.

In 1936 an airfield was constructed on the Alfina plateau, designed by Pier Luigi Nervi. It was subsequently destroyed during World War II.

== Geography ==
Castel Viscardo is situated on a plateau at an elevation of about 500 metres (1,600 ft), with the river Paglia flowing at its foot. The surrounding territory is largely hilly.

Castel Viscardo is located about 4 miles (6.4 km) northeast of Acquapendente and 5 miles (8.0 km) west of Orvieto. Its position affords a wide surrounding view.

The area is bordered by woods to the south and north. The climate is noted as harsh in winter and temperate in summer, with exposure to all winds.

Castel Viscardo borders the following municipalities: Acquapendente, Allerona, Castel Giorgio, Orvieto.

=== Subdivisions ===
The municipality includes the localities of Castel Viscardo, Le Prese, Località Alfina, Località Cornale, Monterubiaglio, Pianlungo, Viceno.

In 2021, 169 people lived in rural dispersed dwellings not assigned to any named locality. At the time, most of the population lived in Castel Viscardo proper (967), Pianlungo (753), and Monterubiaglio (533).

==== Monterubiaglio ====
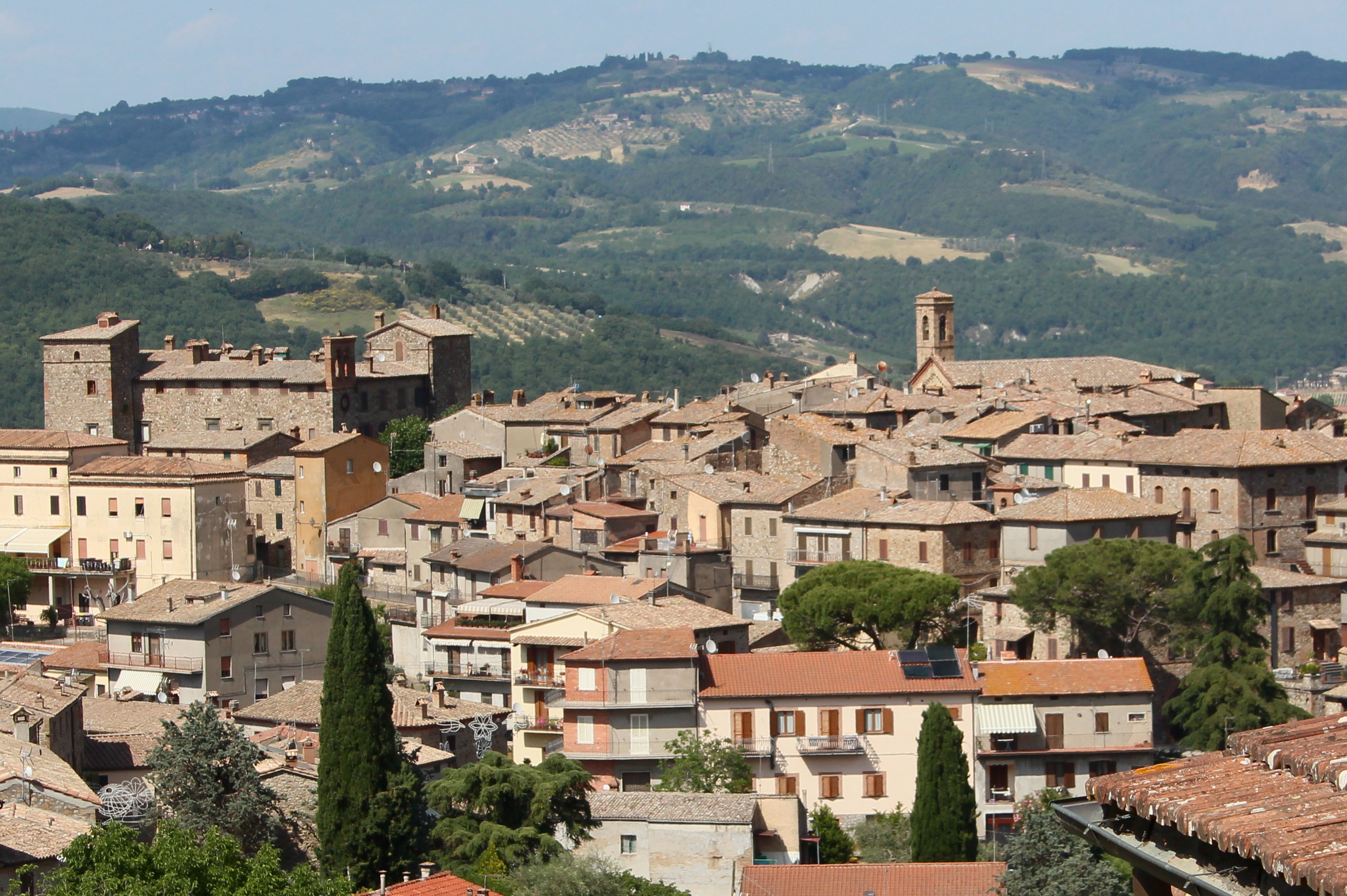
View of Monterubiaglio

Monterubiaglio is a small hilltop village, below Castel Viscardo. The name Monterubiaglio literally means "red garlic mountain". Monterubiaglio has approximately 600 inhabitants, but during the summer time the population grows much larger as it is a popular vacation spot for persons who are originally from the village but may have moved elsewhere such as Rome.

In 1701, Monte Rubiaglio was a feudal domain of the Lattanzi and Negroni families. By 1803, it had passed to Count Negroni of Orvieto. In 1816, it belonged to Count Vincenzo Negroni.

Since 2006, the Department of Classics at Saint Anselm College has been excavating an Etrusco-Romano site just below Monterubiaglio. The excavation has yielded a number of finds and structures that date from the 8th century BCE to the 10th CE.

Local agriculture is a primary industry, particular viticulture, and its production is part of the Orvieto wine-producing region, which is best known for the white wine Orvieto Classico. Lately, however, some wine growers have produced a new label "Monrubio", which is a red wine.

== Economy ==
In the late 19th century the area produced excellent and highly valued wine, as well as pasture, grain, and, in the more mountainous parts, firewood and charcoal. The local economy included the production of pottery in numerous kilns, as well as terracotta materials and lime.

== Religion and culture ==
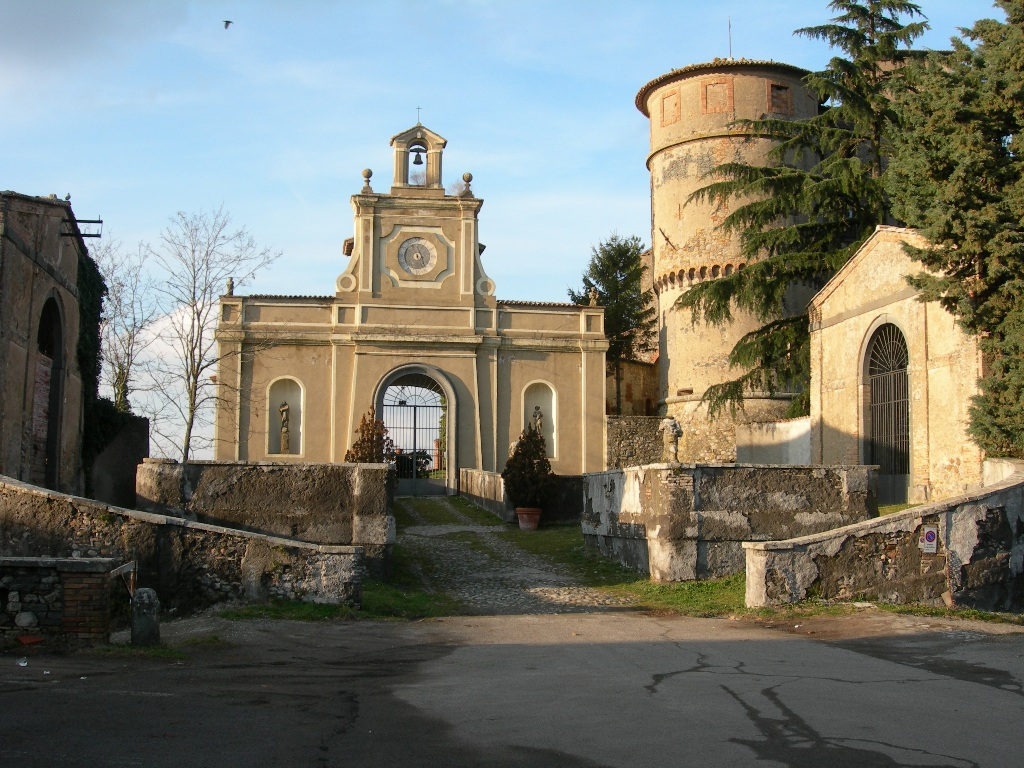
Castello di Madonna

The principal church is dedicated to the Santissima Annunziata and contains an organ and five altars. Another church is dedicated to Saint Augustine.

The parish church preserves an ivory crucifix, said to have been a gift from a king of France to Fabrizio Spada, who served as nuncio at his court. It also houses an Ottoman banner taken during a clash between Francesco Alviano Spada and the Turks.

Saint George is venerated as the patron saint. Popular festivities take place in May for the Invention of the Holy Cross and in June for Saint Anthony of Padua.

== Notable people ==
- Among the principal families recorded in the 19th century are the Spada, a princely family, and the Valentini of Orvieto.
- William Parente - Prince of Castel Viscardo and owner of Welbeck Abbey and Estate in England, United Kingdom.
