= Bellocchi =

Bellocchi is a surname. Notable people with the surname include:

- Gianni Bellocchi (born 1969), Italian scientist
- Natale H. Bellocchi (1926–2014), American industrial engineer, veteran, and diplomat
