= Santa Maria del Popolo, Leonessa =

Church in Lazio, Italy

Coordinates: 42.5634°N 12.9635°E

Santa Maria del Popolo (Saint Mary of the People) is a Romanesque-style, Roman Catholic church located on Corso di San Giuseppe between via Sbarra and via Recta in the town of Leonessa, province of Rieti, region of Lazio, central Italy.

== History ==
The first documentation of the church is from 1334. Once called Chiesa del Sesto di Croce, as it was enlarged it became known as the parish church of the town, and from the 15th-century forward it was known as Santa Maria del Popolo or dei Preti. It became a collegiate church in the 17th-century.

The facade is made of asymmetric stone bricks, and has a flat sail-like bell feature asymmetrically placed on the roof. Above the portal is a high oculus. The portal has a rounded, slightly peaked Romanesque arch with a tympanum housing a simple, but charming sculpted relief of the Virgin and child in her lap flanked by two figures. The doorway is flanked by decorative columns. Inscriptions on the facade cite a reconstruction in 1452, and a refurbishment in 1598.

The interior has three naves, with heavy pilasters flanking the central nave. The semicircular apse is elevated relative to the rest of the church. The church suffered from recent earthquakes and in the 21st century underwent restoration.
