= San Giovanni in Val di Lago, San Lorenzo Nuovo =

Ruined church in Lazio, Italy

Coordinates: 42.653969°N 11.90635°E

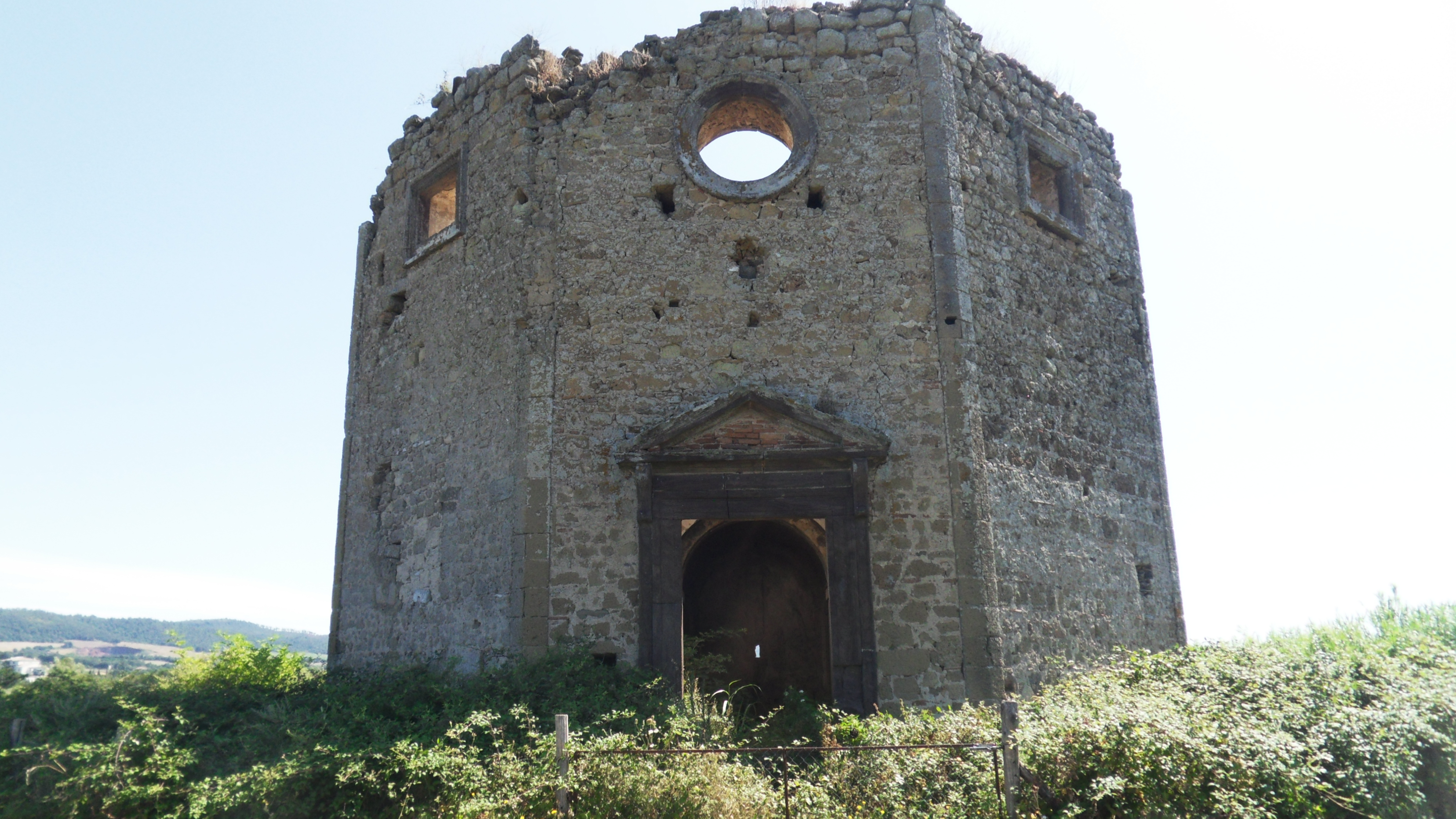
Front view of San Giovanni in Val di Lago

San Giovanni in Val di Lago is a Renaissance-style, Roman Catholic former church, now ruins, of sanctuary located outside of the town of San Lorenzo Nuovo, province of Viterbo, Lazio, Italy.

The ruins are notable for the octagonal shape of the church, erected between 1563 and 1590 to designs by Pietro Tartarino, pupil of Alberto da Sangallo. The church was erected at the site of a supposed apparition of St John the Baptist to a peasant boy.
