= Acaste Bresciani =

Italian writer and priest (1882–1969)

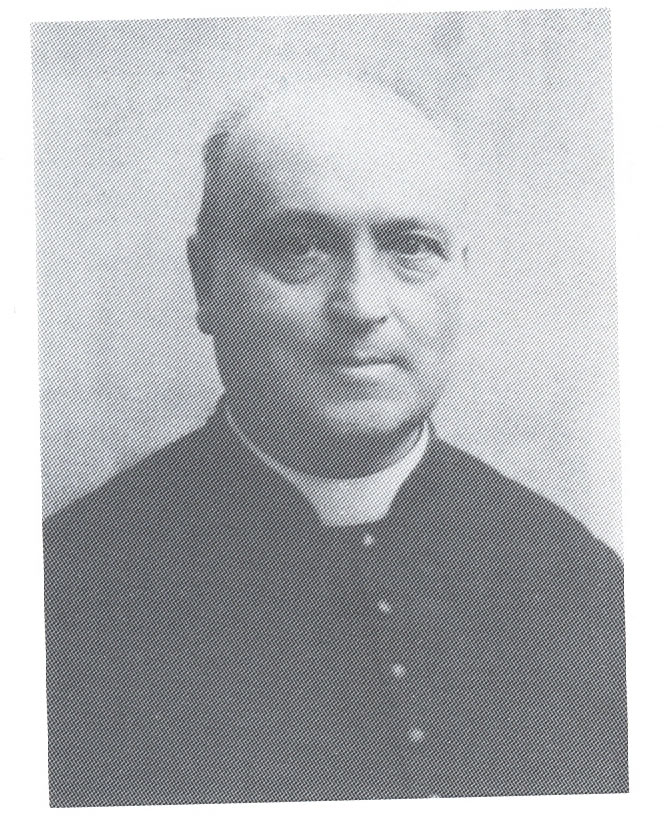
Acaste Bresciani.

Acaste Bresciani (June 22, 1882 – March 2, 1969) was an Italian religious figure and author.

He was born in San Lorenzo Nuovo, northern Lazio. He was ordained priest at Montefiascone in 1905, and spent all his life as a pastor and teacher. He was Parish assistant at San Lorenzo Nuovo since 1905, where he also filled the position of bursar vicarious for two times. In this role, he promoted major restoration works of the parish church in 1940. Examiner and judge of priests, he was teacher in the seminaries of Montefiascone and Cosenza.

An accomplished poet in Latin, his compositions have been internationally acknowledged. Worth to mention is the composition for Aquileia, in the 10th anniversary of the burial of unnamed soldiers. Other published works are Navigazioni notturne sul lago di Bolsena and Cristina. Parish priest of that time, he left a dramatic account in the parish chronicle of the tragic period experienced by San Lorenzo Nuovo during the bombings in June 1944.

He was a Certamen laureate after 1943.

He died in San Lorenzo Nuovo in 1969. The schools of the city were named after him.
