= San Pietro, Leonessa =

Church in Leonessa, Italy

Coordinates: 42°33′39.7″N 12°57′49.9″E

San Pietro is a Gothic-style, Roman Catholic church in the center of the town of Leonessa, province of Rieti, region of Lazio, central Italy.

== History ==
The church was once part of an Augustinian convent. The present church was built atop an older church structure (Santa Maria delle Grazie) which became the crypt. The church is now property of the Fondo Edifici Culto (FEC). Documents cite construction starting by 1344 but other do not cite completion until the 15th century. It is likely the plague in 1363 slowed construction. In 1422, in the attached convent, the Augustinian order of the valley of Spoleto held a general chapter. In 1609, the local clergy, and not the Augustinians, gained the right to direct funeral services in the atrium of the church. During the Napoleonic era, the government of Murat expropriated the convent for use by the government and military. In 1868, the Italian government granted the sites administration to the Confraternita della Pietà e delle Grazie. In the subsequent years it underwent significant restorations.

The church has a tall rectangular facade with a decorative portal in pink local stone and an asymmetric oculus. The roofline is horizontal. The portal is flanked by pilasters formed from the Romanesque stylized half-columns. In the archivolt is a statue of St John the Baptist, while flanking above on two protruding pilasters are statues of Saints Peter and Paul, patrons of the town. The tall gothic bell tower has three stories above the roofline, and stands on the left of the facade. The inferior story has a clock, which ring bells every thirty minutes. The roof is a stone octagonal cone.

The single nave is flanked by altars. The second altarpiece on the right depicts the Holy Family by Simone Pignoni. The third altarpiece on the right has a Virgin and Child by Giovanni Lanfranco. The fourth altarpiece on the right displays a The charity of St Thomas of Villanova.
