= Leonessa =

- Comune
- Comune di Leonessa
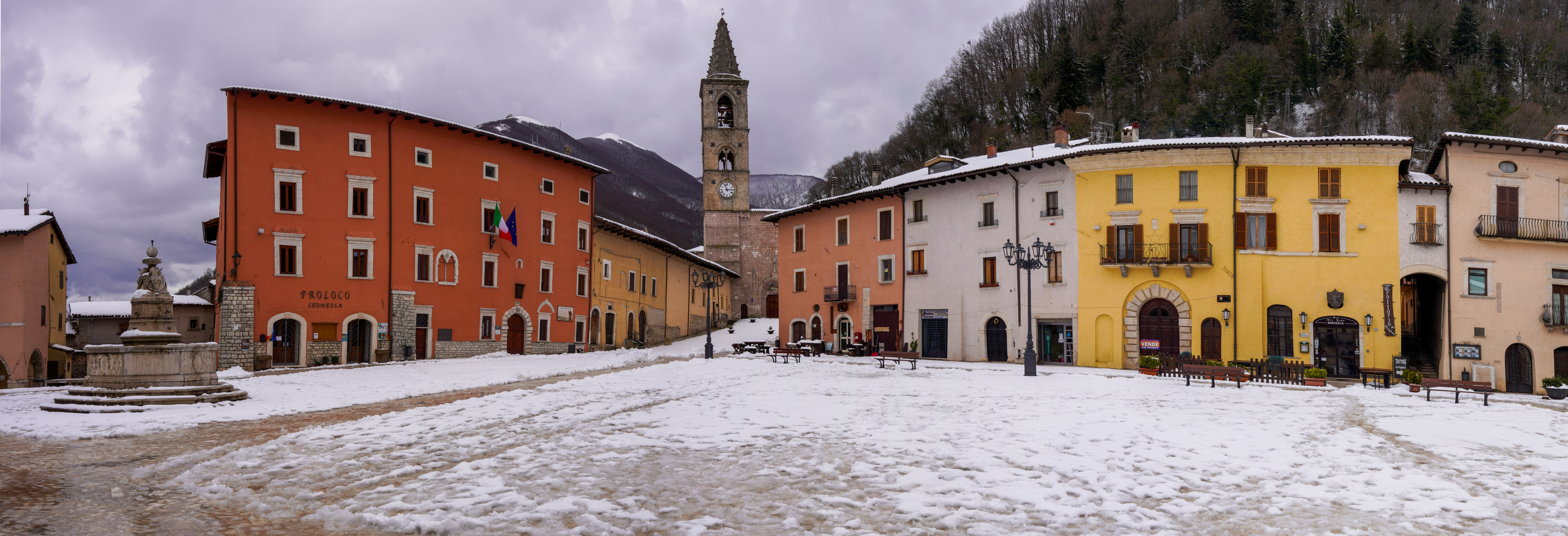
- Town square

- Coat of arms

- Location within Italy Location within Lazio
- Coordinates: 42°34′N 12°58′E
- Country: Italy
- Region: Lazio
- Province: Rieti (RI)
- Frazioni: list

Government
  - Mayor: Gianluca Gizzi

Area
  - Total: 205 km^{2} (79 sq mi)
- Elevation: 969 m (3,179 ft)

Population (2008)
  - Total: 2,648
  - Density: 12.9/km^{2} (33.5/sq mi)
- Demonym: Leonessani
- Time zone: UTC+1 (CET)
  - Summer (DST): UTC+2 (CEST)
- Postal code: 02016
- Dialing code: 0746
- Patron saint: St. Joseph of Leonessa
- Saint day: February 4
- Website: Official website

Leonessa is also the name of a frazione of Bassano Romano.

Leonessa is a town and comune in the far northeastern part of the Province of Rieti in the Lazio region of central Italy. Its population in 2008 was around 2,700.

Situated in a small plain at the foot of Mt. Terminillo, one of the highest mountains of the Apennine range, in the winter Leonessa is known mostly as a low-key staging center for the ski slopes of the Terminillo, and in the summer as a weekend vacation town frequented for the most part by Romans with local roots.

Historically, the town is known mostly as the birthplace of St. Giuseppe di Leonessa. Until 1927 it was part of the province of L'Aquila. The town suffered one of the worst German reprisals during World War II when the Wehrmacht and the SS killed 51 inhabitants in early April 1944. A monument dedicated to the dead was erected in 1959. Typical food production include the local variety of potato, known as patata di Leonessa.

Leonessa is twinned with the French town of Gonesse.

== Main sights ==
Leonessa is an art city of primarily medieval aspect, with a historical main square. Churches include:

- San Pietro
- San Francesco
- Church and sanctuary of San Giuseppe
- Santa Maria del Popolo
- Madonna di Loreto

== Frazioni ==
Albaneto, Casanova, Fontenova, Leonessa Colleverde, Cumulata, Sala, San Clemente, San Vito, Vallimpuni, Viesci, Vindoli, Volciano, Casale dei Frati, Villa Alesse, Villa Berti, Villa Bigioni, Villa Bradde, Villa Carmine, Villa Ciavatta, Villa Climinti, Villa Colapietro, Villa Cordisco, Villa Gizzi, Villa Lucci, Villa Massi, Villa Pulcini, Villa Zunna, Albaneto, Piedelpoggio, Villa Immagine, Corvatello, Sant'Angelo, Terzone, Casa Buccioli, Capodacqua, Ocre, Pianezza, San Giovenale, Vallunga
