= Joseph of Leonessa =

Italian Roman Catholic saint

Saint Joseph of Leonessa OFMCap
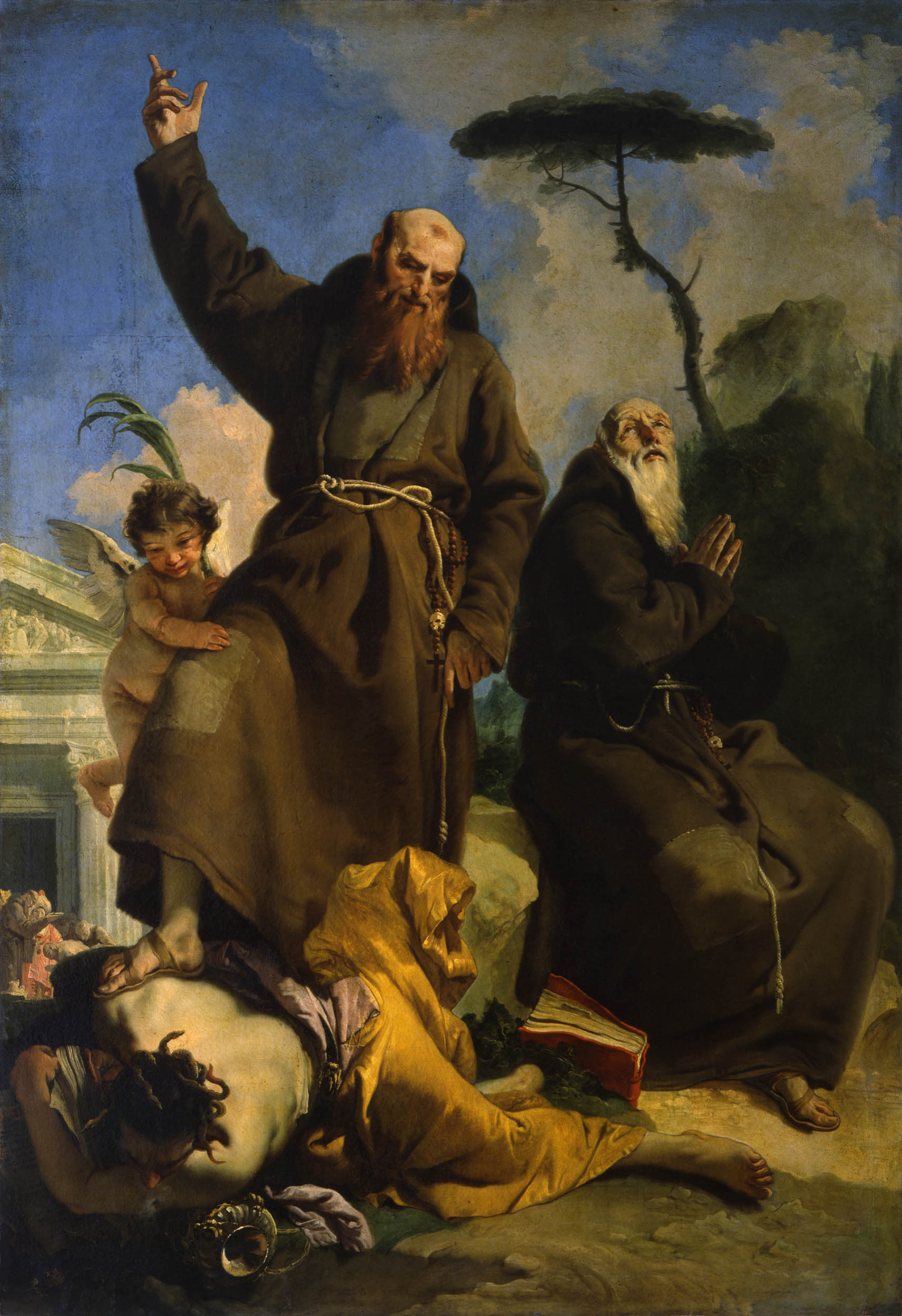
- Saint Fidelis of Sigmaringen and Saint Joseph of Leonessa, by Tiepolo
- Born: January 8, 1556; Leonessa, Italy
- Died: February 4, 1612; Amatrice, Italy
- Venerated in: Roman Catholic Church
- Beatified: 22 June 1737 by Pope Clement XII
- Canonized: 29 June 1746 by Pope Benedict XIV
- Feast: February 4

Joseph of Leonessa, OFM Cap. (Italian: Giuseppe da Leonessa; born Eufranio Desiderio; 1556 – February 4, 1612) was an Italian Capuchin friar. He was canonized by Pope Benedict XIV in 1746. His feast day is kept on February 4 within the Franciscan family.

== Biography ==
He was born Eufranio Desiderio at Leonessa, a small town then in Umbria, now in the Lazio to Giovanni Desideri and Serafina Paolini. It is said that from a young age he showed a remarkably religious bent of mind.

He was orphaned at the age of twelve. His uncle saw to his education, first in Viterbo, then at Spoleto. His uncle had planned a suitable marriage for him, but Eufranio fell sick of a fever in his sixteenth year, and upon his recovery, without consulting his guardian, joined the Capuchin reform of the Franciscan Order. He made his novitiate at the friary of the Carcerelle near Assisi.

He made his religious profession in January 1573, taking the name "Joseph", and continued his studies in Lugnano in Teverina. He preached in small towns throughout Umbria, Lazio and the Abruzzi, and had some success with the bandits around Arquata del Tronto. As a friar he was remarkable for his great abstinence. In 1599, the year before the Jubilee year, he fasted the whole year by way of preparation for gaining the indulgence.

=== Constantinople ===
In 1587 he was sent by the Minister General of his Order to Constantinople to minister to the Christians held captive there. Arrived there he and his companions lodged in the Galata district in a derelict house of Benedictine monks, actually the St. Benedict high school. He was very solicitous in ministering to the captive Christians in the galleys of the Ottoman Empire's navy. When plague broke out in the penal colonies, the Capuchins immediately tended to the sick and dying. Joseph became ill, but recovered. Every day he went into the city to preach, and he was at length thrown into prison and only released at the intervention of the Venetian agent.

Urged on by zeal he at last sought to enter the palace to speak with Sultan Murad III, but he was seized and condemned to death. For three days he hung on the gallows, held up by two hooks driven through his right hand and foot. Near death, on the evening of the third day, he was let down.

=== Return to Italy ===
Returning to Italy in 1589, Joseph now took up the work of home missions in his native province, sometimes preaching six or seven times a day. In the Jubilee year of 1600 he gave the Lenten sermons at Otricoli, a town through which crowds of pilgrims passed on their way to Rome. Many of them being very poor, Joseph supplied them with food; he also washed their clothes and taught them catechism. At Todi he cultivated with his own hands a garden, the produce of which was for the poor. He organised a Monti di Pietà (a co-op for loans) and built a small hospice for travelers and pilgrims. Joseph died of cancer at Amatrice in 1612.

== Veneration ==
He was canonized by Pope Benedict XIV in 1746. His feast day is kept on February 4 within the Franciscan family.

He is the patron saint of Amatrice and Leonessa. Pope Pius XII proclaimed him patron of the Missions in Turkey. He is one of the patrons of the Capuchin province of Abruzzo. In his hometown, there is a church and sanctuary of San Giuseppe da Leonessa. The main street is named after him, the Corso San Giuseppe. Devotion to him is largely in central Italy; churches in Otricoli, San Lorenzo Nuovo, and the Madonna Della Valle in Rivodutri contain paintings of him.

His iconography includes the martyrdom of the hook or a crucifix in his hand.
