= Acquapendente =

- Comune
- Comune di Acquapendente
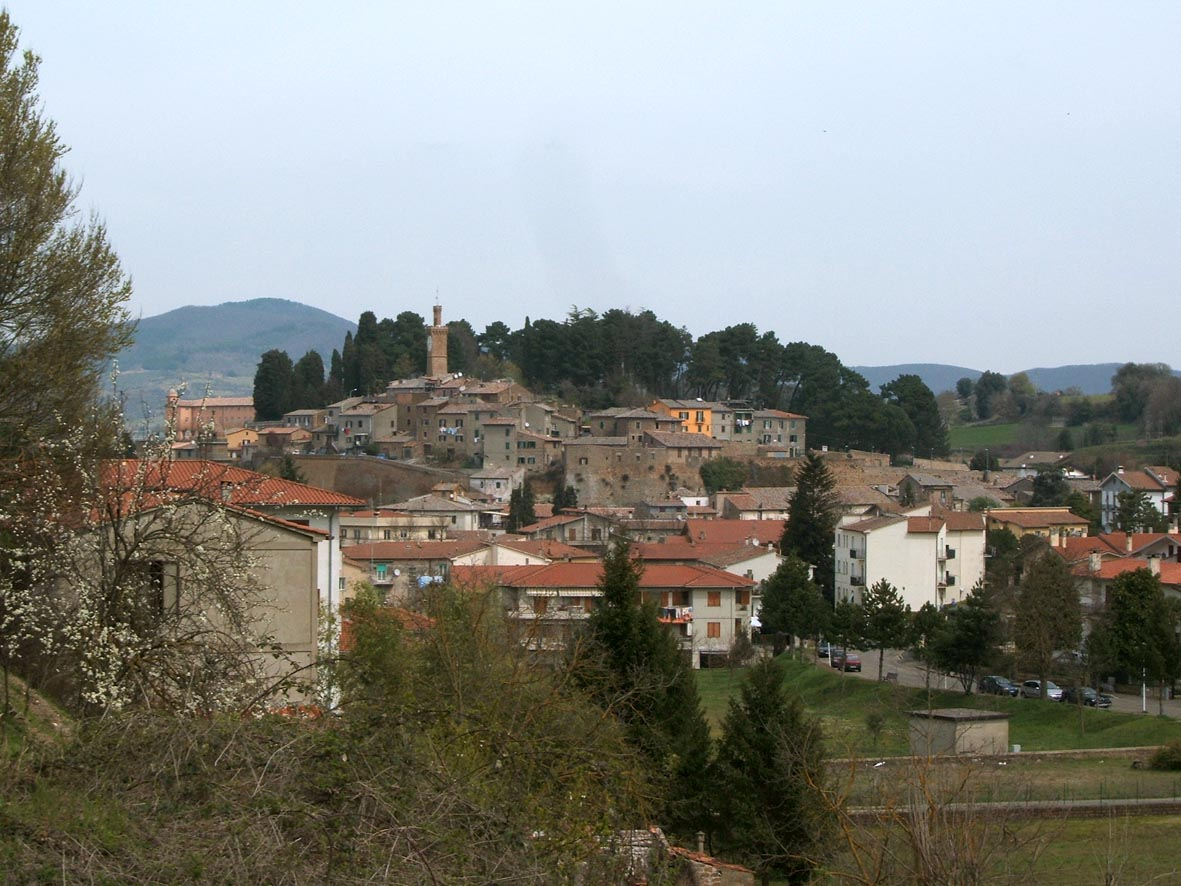

- Acquapendente within the Province of Viterbo

- Location of Acquapendente in Italy Acquapendente (Lazio)
- Coordinates: 42°44′38″N 11°51′52″E
- Country: Italy
- Region: Lazio
- Province: Viterbo (VT)
- Frazioni: Torre Alfina, Trevinano

Government
  - Mayor: Alessandra Terrosi (since Oct 5, 2021)

Area
  - Total: 131.61 km^{2} (50.81 sq mi)
- Elevation: 420 m (1,380 ft)

Population (01 January 2024)
  - Total: 5,308
  - Density: 40.33/km^{2} (104.5/sq mi)
- Demonym: Aquesiani
- Time zone: UTC+1 (CET)
  - Summer (DST): UTC+2 (CEST)
- Postal code: 01021
- Dialing code: 0763
- Patron saint: Saint Hermes
- Saint day: August 28
- Website: Official website

Acquapendente is a city and comune in the province of Viterbo, in Lazio (Italy). Acquapendente is a centre for the agricultural production of vegetables and wine, and has a tradition of pottery craftsmanship. Its frazione of Torre Alfina is one of I Borghi più belli d'Italia ("The most beautiful villages of Italy").

== History ==
The area of modern Acquapendente was settled by Etruscans in Roman times, as archaeological finds have shown. However, the first historical document of the modern city dates from the 9th century AD, with a town named Farisa or Arisa along the Via Francigena. A document from Emperor Otto I, dated 964, contains the first recorded use of the name Acquapendentem which means "hanging water", from several small waterfalls in the Paglia river on the boundary between Lazio and Tuscany.

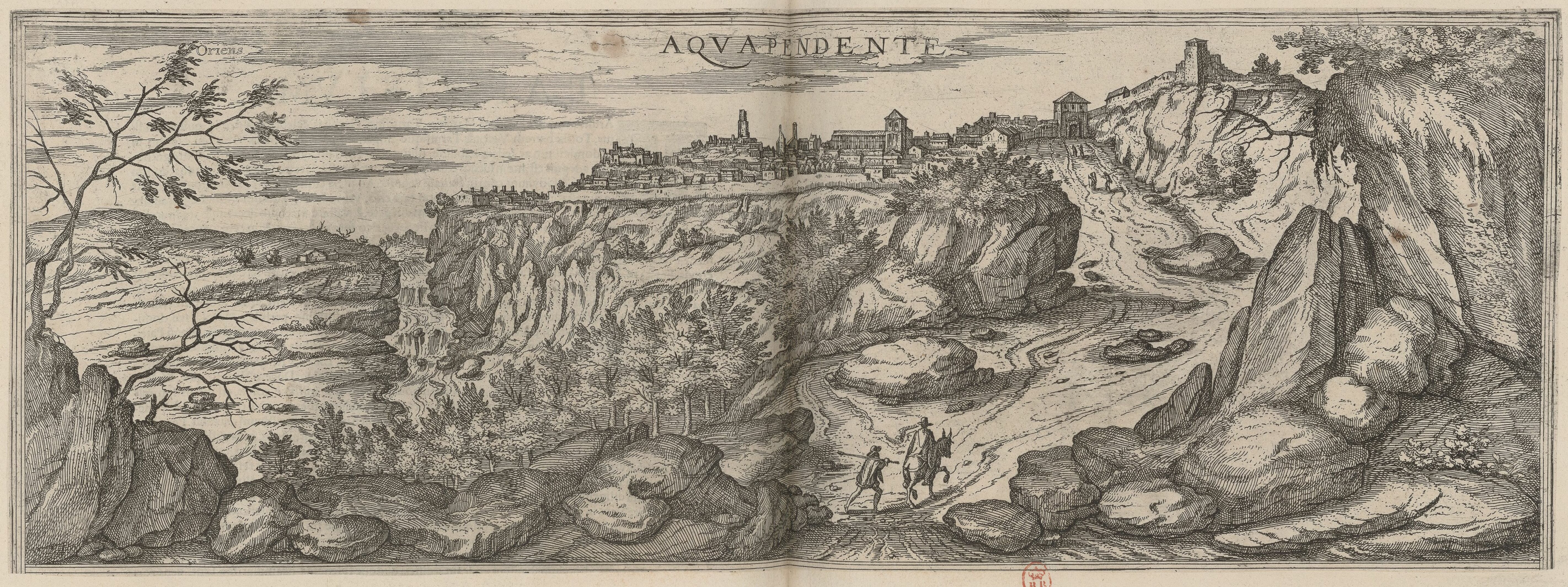
Historical view towards Acquapendente (1640)

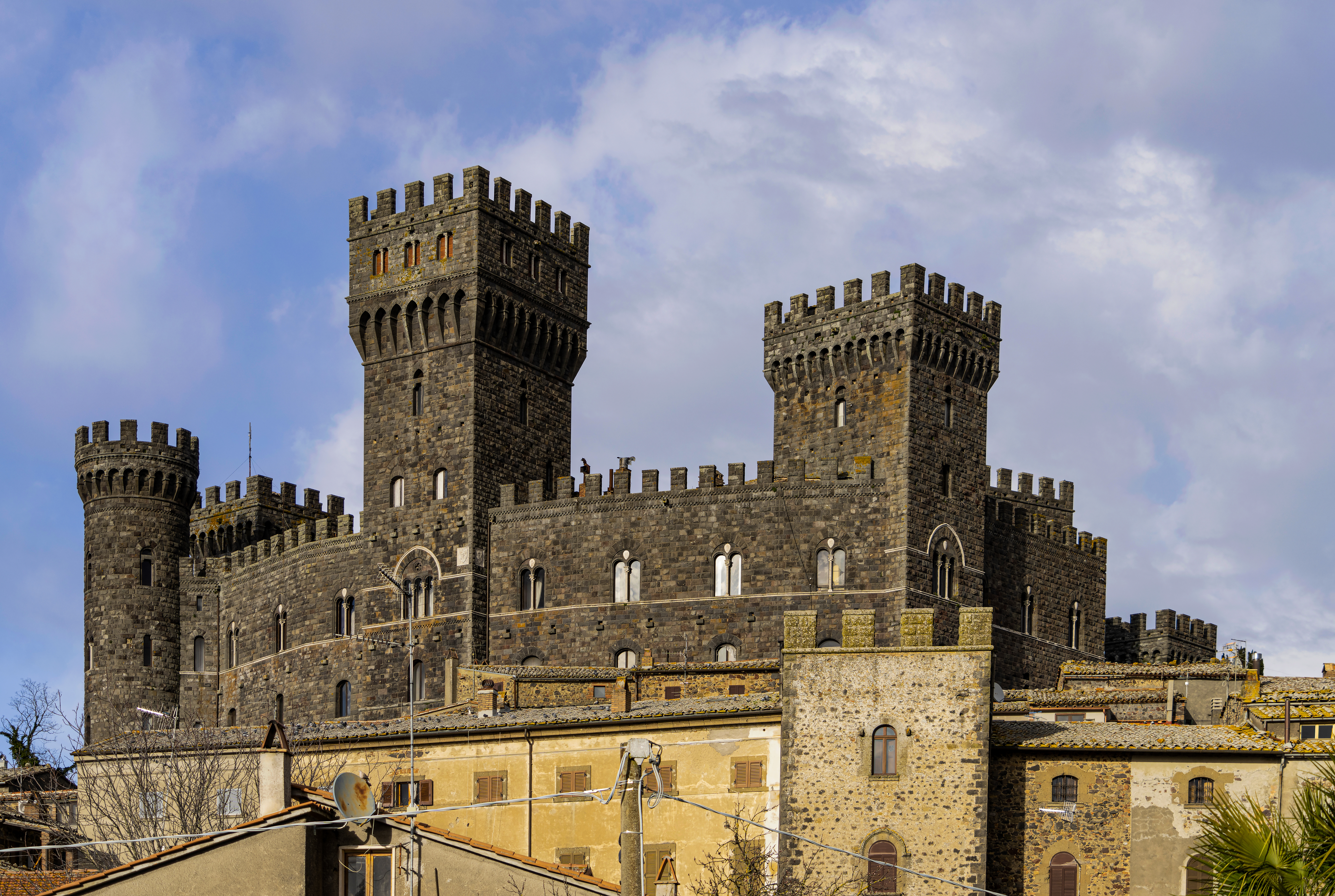
Torre Alfina, about 8 kilometers east of Acquapendente

Acquapendente was the first stop in Italy in the travels of Saint Roch in the early 14th century; the saint supposedly spent several days in the hospital there curing plague victims.

The city was later part of the March of Tuscany and, from the end of the 14th century and beginning of the 15th, it was part of the commune (later Republic) of Siena. In 1449 it became an independent centre within the Papal States.

After the complete destruction of Castro, Lazio in 1649, Acquapendente, previously part of the diocese of Orvieto, became the seat of a diocese that included what had been the diocese of Castro. The diocese of Acquapendente continued in existence until 27 March 1986, when its territory was added to that of Viterbo. No longer a residential bishopric, Aquipendium, as it is called in Latin, is today listed by the Catholic Church as a titular see.

== Geography ==
Located in the north of the Lazio, near the borders with Tuscany and Umbria, the municipality of Acquapendente borders with Allerona (TR), Castel Giorgio (TR), Castel Viscardo (TR), Grotte di Castro, Onano, Proceno, San Lorenzo Nuovo, San Casciano dei Bagni (SI) and Sorano (GR).

== Main sights ==
- Acquapendente Cathedral (1149)
- The Watch Tower, remains of the Imperial Castle
- The church of St. Augustine (16th century)
- The church of St. Francis
- The castle of the frazione Torre Alfina, whose central tower (Italian: cassero) was built by the Lombard king Desiderius. The castle was captured by the Neapolitan condottiero Fabrizio Maramaldo during the 1527 Siege of Rome, but the defenders gallantly retained the Cassero.
- The castle of the frazione Trevinano known from the 12th century.
- The Monte Rufeno Natural Reserve, 2 kilometres (1.2 mi) north of the city, at an elevation of 748 metres (2,454 ft). It has spectacular woods housing wildlife including, among others, wild boars, Eurasian eagle-owls, turtles and beech martens.
- A POW camp from World War II

== Personalities ==
- Flavian, saint, martyr (+316)
- Hieronymus Fabricius (1537–1619), anatomist and surgeon
