= Castel Giorgio =

- Comune
- Comune di Castel Giorgio
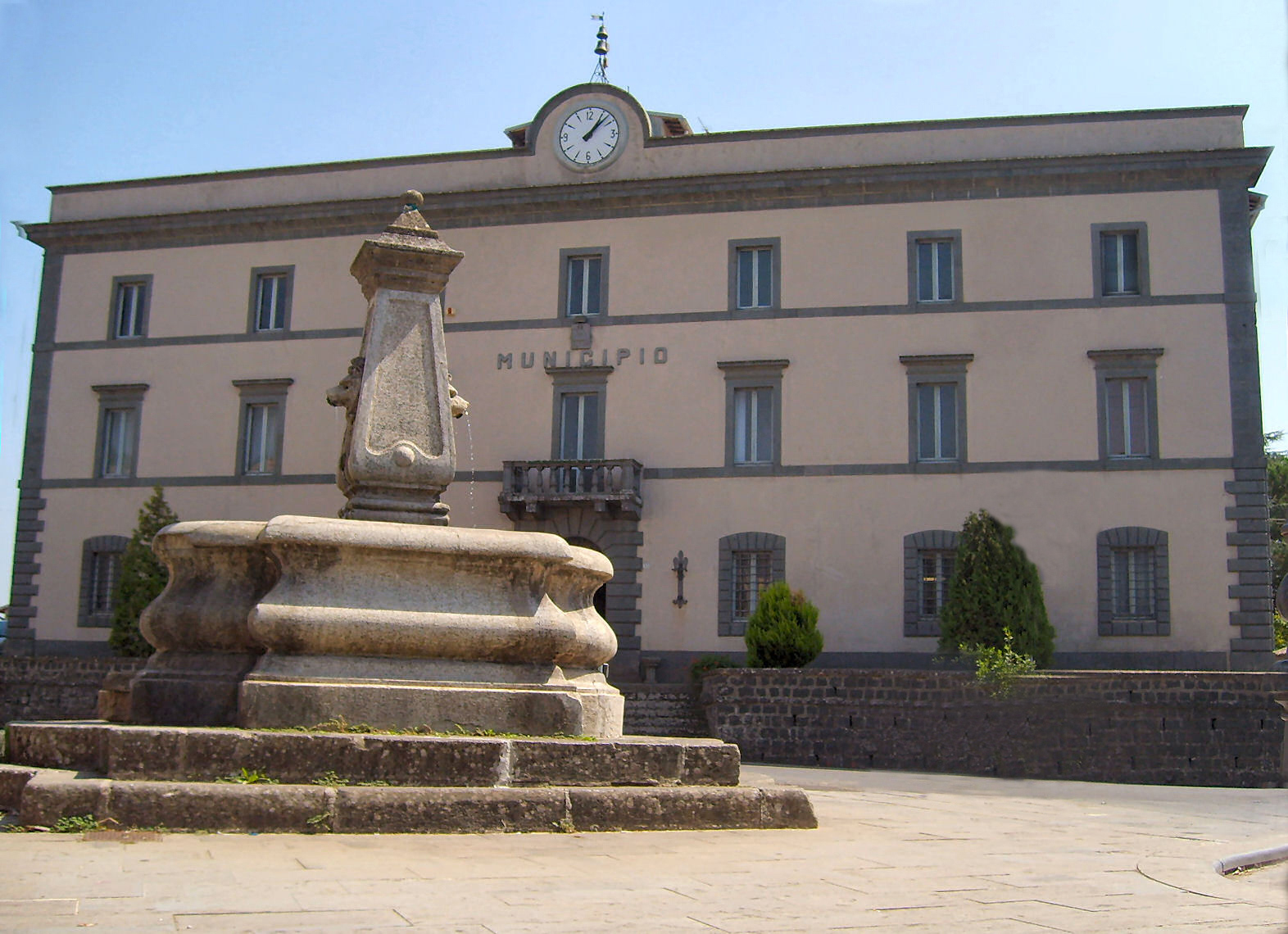
- Town Hall in Castel Giorgio

- Location within Italy Location within Umbria
- Coordinates: 42.707813°N 11.979594°E
- Country: Italy
- Region: Umbria
- Province: Terni (TR)

Government
  - Mayor: Andrea Garbini

Area
  - Total: 42.3 km^{2} (16.3 sq mi)
- Elevation: 559 m (1,834 ft)

Population (1 January 2025)
  - Total: 2,002
  - Density: 47.3/km^{2} (123/sq mi)
- Demonym: Castelgiorgesi
- Time zone: UTC+1 (CET)
  - Summer (DST): UTC+2 (CEST)
- Postal code: 05013
- Dialing code: 0763
- Patron saint: St. Pancratius
- Saint day: May 12
- Website: Official website

Castel Giorgio is a comune (municipality) in the Province of Terni in the Italian region Umbria, located about 60 kilometres (37 mi) southwest of Perugia and about 60 km northwest of Terni on the Alfine Highland, facing the Lake Bolsena.

== History ==
Remains from prehistoric Villanovan civilization settlements were found in the area of Castel Giorgio in 1993. Also present are an Etruscan necropolis (3rd-2nd centuries BC) and remains of Roman villas and roads (Via Traiana Nova and Via Cassia).

Castel Giorgio developed as a settlement in 1476 under the initiative of Bishop Giorgio della Rovere, from whom it takes its name. It was established with the settlement of farming families drawn from the Parma area. The initial construction included a castle, church, palace and annexed buildings, financed by the bishopric of Orvieto.

Conflict soon arose between the della Rovere and the Valenti of Castel Rubello in Porano, during which the castle was largely destroyed. Further disruption followed in the 1490s with the passage of the troops of Charles VIII of France. A fire in 1497 and earthquakes in 1505 and 1511 caused additional damage, leading to major reconstruction works in the late 16th century.

A statute was issued in 1581, and the settlement remained under the barony of the bishops of Orvieto until Italian unification. In 1620 the castle was entirely rebuilt under Giacomo Sannesio and used as a summer residence for cardinals and prelates. In 1642 it was the site of peace negotiations connected with the Duchy of Castro.

In 1701, Castel Giorgio was a feudal domain of the Bishop of Orvieto, a status which it is recorded as retaining in 1803. By 1817, ownership is recorded under Bishop Giovanni Lambroschini of Orvieto.

The French invasion of 1798 brought Castel Giorgio into the Roman Republic, where it was included in the canton of Orvieto. After the Restoration in 1814 it was assigned to the Delegation of Viterbo. At that time the settlement consisted of scattered houses, a parish church and the episcopal palace, alongside a small cluster of houses known as Casa Galli.

In 1816 it was recorded as a baronial place in the district of Orvieto. Administrative reforms in 1827 confirmed its status as a municipality, with Benano as a dependency.

On 11 September 1860 Castel Giorgio was annexed to the Kingdom of Italy.

In the late 19th century Castel Giorgio had a population of 1,766 inhabitants.

== Geography ==
Castel Giorgio is located about 18 kilometres (11 mi) from Orvieto, on a plateau at an elevation of 559 metres (1,834 ft). It is crossed by the Romealla stream, which flows into the Paglia river. The terrain is of volcanic origin and is generally flat.

Castel Giorgio lies at a distance of 7 miles (11 km) from Orvieto, 5 miles (8.0 km) from Bolsena, and 7 miles (11 km) from Acquapendente.

The settlement is characterized by a dispersed pattern of habitation, with houses spread across a wide territory and often at considerable distances from one another, rather than concentrated in a compact village.

=== Subdivisions ===
The municipality includes the localities of Bellocchio, Casa Perazza, Case Fabbri, Case Taschini, Case Vecchie, Castel Giorgio, Nane, Poderetto, Ravisa.

In 2021, 314 people lived in rural dispersed dwellings not assigned to any named locality. At the time, the most populous locality was Castel Giorgio proper (1,534).

== Economy ==
In the 19th century Castel Giorgio had a predominantly rural economy. Most inhabitants were engaged in agriculture, cultivating the land under sharecropping arrangements. The principal economic activities included livestock breeding, timber production, cardboard manufacturing, and the production of potash.

== Religion and culture ==
The parish of San Giorgio served the community. The principal local celebration is held on 12 May in honor of Saint Pancras.

=== San Pancrazio ===
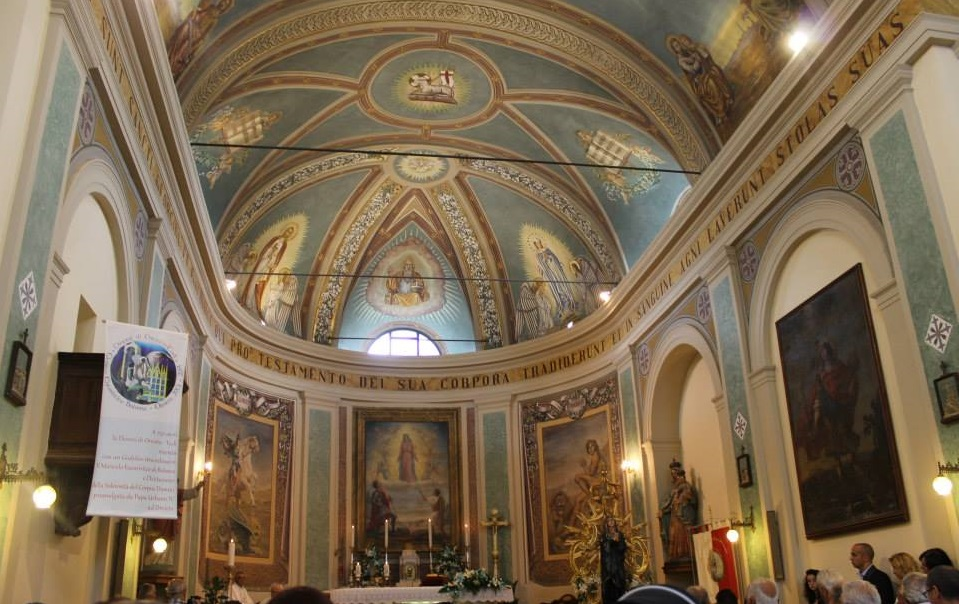
The church of San Pancrazio

The church of San Pancrazio, dating to the 17th century, features a red façade articulated by four dark pilaster strips arranged in pairs, supporting a projecting triangular pediment. At ground level there is a simple trabeated portal, while a small square window is set above at the center, both framed with dark stucco decoration.

The interior consists of a single nave with side chapels and a semicircular apse, separated from the rest of the church by a triumphal arch. The apse has been decorated with frescoes in recent times.

=== Main sights ===
- Montalfina Castle
- Etruscan necropolis of the Lauscello

=== Sports ===
The municipality of Castel Giorgio is also known as "European Capital of American football" because within the territory of the town there is the "Vince Lombardi stadium", the first gridiron football field in Italy designed for this sport.

== Notable people ==
The principal families recorded in the 19th century include the Pacetti, Rocchini, and Paolini.

Other notable people from Castel Giorgio include Alice Rohrwacher, Italian film director
