= 1530 =

1530 in various calendars
- Gregorian calendar: 1530; MDXXX
- Ab urbe condita: 2283
- Armenian calendar: 979; ԹՎ ՋՀԹ
- Assyrian calendar: 6280
- Balinese saka calendar: 1451–1452
- Bengali calendar: 936–937
- Berber calendar: 2480
- English Regnal year: 21 Hen. 8 – 22 Hen. 8
- Buddhist calendar: 2074
- Burmese calendar: 892
- Byzantine calendar: 7038–7039
- Chinese calendar: 己丑年 (Earth Ox); 4227 or 4020 — to — 庚寅年 (Metal Tiger); 4228 or 4021
- Coptic calendar: 1246–1247
- Discordian calendar: 2696
- Ethiopian calendar: 1522–1523
- Hebrew calendar: 5290–5291
- Hindu calendars
- Vikram Samvat: 1586–1587
- Shaka Samvat: 1451–1452
- Kali Yuga: 4630–4631
- Holocene calendar: 11530
- Igbo calendar: 530–531
- Iranian calendar: 908–909
- Islamic calendar: 936–937
- Japanese calendar: Kyōroku 3 (享禄３年)
- Javanese calendar: 1448–1449
- Julian calendar: 1530; MDXXX
- Korean calendar: 3863
- Minguo calendar: 382 before ROC 民前382年
- Nanakshahi calendar: 62
- Thai solar calendar: 2072–2073
- Tibetan calendar: ས་མོ་གླང་ལོ་ (female Earth-Ox); 1656 or 1275 or 503 — to — ལྕགས་ཕོ་སྟག་ལོ་ (male Iron-Tiger); 1657 or 1276 or 504

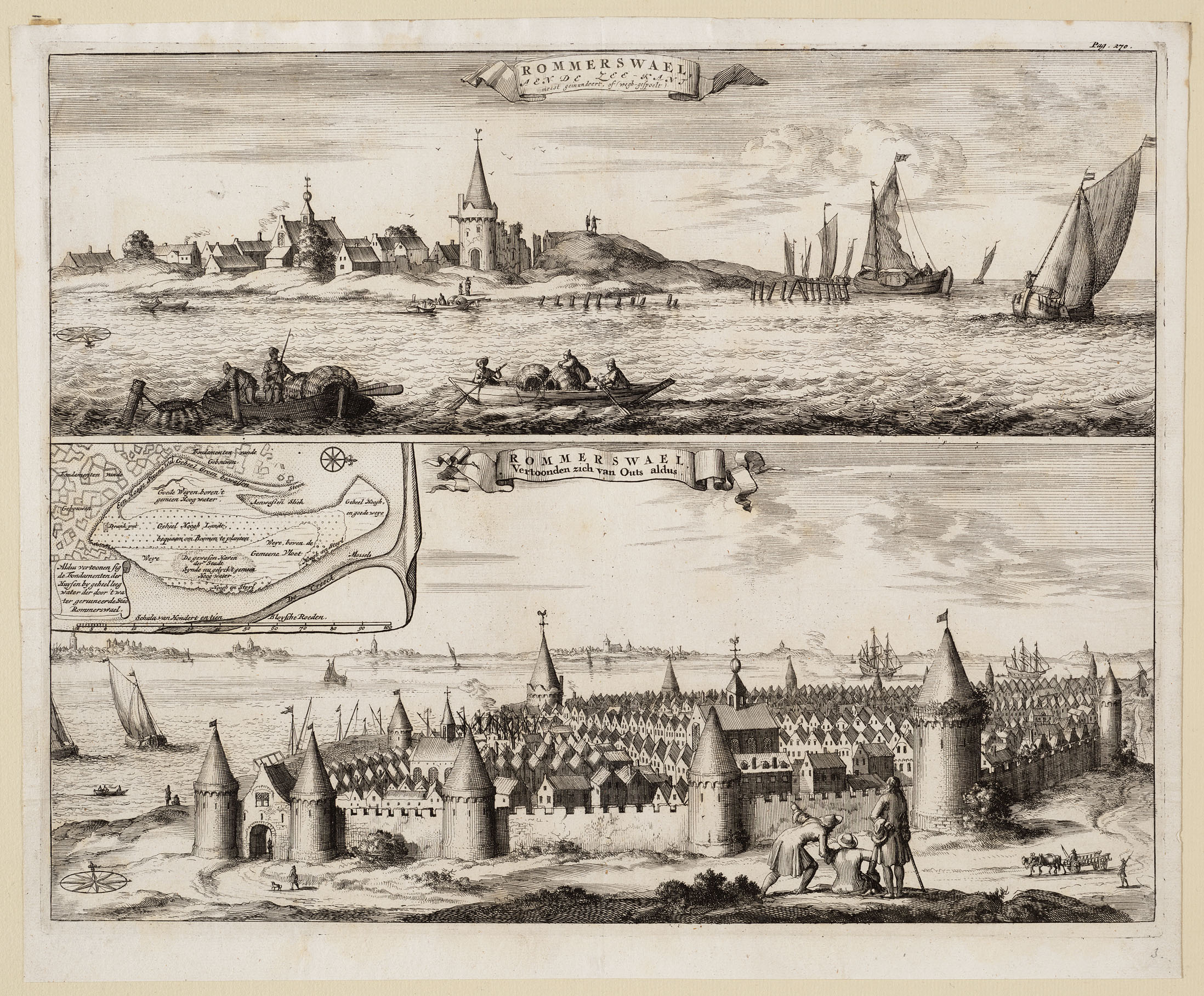
November 5: St. Felix's Flood destroys the city of Reimerswaal

Year 1530 (MDXXX) was a common year starting on Saturday of the Julian calendar, the 1530th year of the Common Era (CE) and Anno Domini (AD) designations, the 530th year of the 2nd millennium, the 30th year of the 16th century, and the 1st year of the 1530s decade.

== Events ==
=== January–March ===
- January 5 – Strasbourg joins the Christliches Burgrecht, the Protestant alliance of Swiss cities.
- January 20 – Sent on a mission to penetrate the interior of Mexico and to conquer the Kingdom of Michoacán, the Spanish conquistador Hernán Cortés leads a group of soldiers across the Lerma river through Cuitzeo and proceeds northwest. They arrive at Tonalá on March 24 and then take possession of the regions south of the Santiago River and north and west of Lake Chapala.
- January 21 – Charles V, Holy Roman Emperor, issues letters from his winter residence in Bologna, inviting members of the Imperial Diet to convene at Augsburg on April 8 to discuss various theological questions.
- February 14 – Tangaxuan II, last cazonci of the Purépecha Empire, is executed by conquistador Nuño de Guzmán, ending the Purépecha Empire's independence from Spain.
- February 24 – Charles V is crowned emperor in Bologna, by Pope Clement VII.
- March 23 – The Tribute of the Maltese Falcon, an agreement by the Grand Master of the Order of St John of Jerusalem to pay an annual tribute to the Charles V, King of Sicily, in return for an order granting the Knights full rulership of Tripoli and the islands of Malta and Gozo, is reached. The transfer of ownership takes place on October 26, 1550, although Tripoli is conquered by the Ottomans on August 15, 1551.

=== April–June ===
- April 8 – At the invitation of the Holy Roman Emperor, the members of the Imperial Diet open their session at Augsburg in Germany to prepare the Augsburg Confession, an official imperial set of rules for Protestantism.
- May 9 – The Kaqchikel people, a tribe of the Maya people of what is now the Sacatepéquez Department of Guatemala, surrender to the Spanish conquistadors.
- June 25 – The Augsburg Confession is presented to Charles V, Holy Roman Emperor.

=== July–September ===
- July 4 – King François of France marries Eleanor of Austria, daughter of King Philip the Handsome of Castile and widow of King Manuel I of Portugal.
- July 9 – The Tetrapolitan Confession, a Protestant confession of faith, is submitted jointly to Holy Roman Emperor Charles V on behalf of the southern German cities of Konstanz, Lindau, Memmingen and Strasbourg.
- July 19 – Turkish Ottoman troops attempt to take the Hungarian town of Nagykörű but, according to local legend, the Turkish soldiers are lost in a marsh protecting the city.
- July 25 – The transfer of Tripoli, in North Africa, from Spain to the Knights of Malta, is formally accomplished, four months after an agreement was reached with Charles V, Holy Roman Emperor, King of Spain and King of Sicily.
- July 30 – At Neue Augsburg (now Coro in the nation of Venezuela), German explorer Nikolaus Federmann becomes the acting governor of Klein-Venedig ("Little Venice") Germany's short-lived South American colony as Governor Ambrosius Ehinger takes a leave of absence to recover from malaria.
- August 3 – Battle of Gavinana: Florence is captured by Spanish troops under Prince Philibert of Chalon (who is killed in the action). The Piagnon (followers of the memory of Girolamo Savonarola) are overthrown, ending the Siege of Florence, and the Medici are restored, in the person of the Pope's nephew Alessandro de' Medici.
- September 15 – The miraculous portrait of Saint Dominic in Soriano appears in Soriano Calabro, Calabria.

=== October–December ===
- October 8 – A flood engulfs Rome.
- October 26 – The Knights of Malta are formed, when the Knights Hospitaller are given Malta by Charles V. They transfer the island capital from Mdina to Birgu.
- November 5 – St. Felix's flood devastates Zeeland: a large part of the Verdronken Land van Reimerswaal is lost leading to decline of the city of Reimerswaal.
- November 24 – Tabinshwehti succeeds his father Mingyi Nyo as king of the Toungoo dynasty, following the latter's death.
- December 26 – Humayun starts to rule the Mughal Empire after Babur's death.
- December – Martim Afonso de Sousa's expedition sets out for Brazil from Portugal.

=== Date unknown ===
- The ducal palace of Celle is constructed in Germany.
- Austrian forces capture Esztergom, Hungary, and raid as far as Buda.
- Erasmus publishes On Civility in Children (De Civilitate Morum Puerilium Libellus), which becomes popular and widely translated.
- First complete edition of the 'Zürich Bible', Huldrych Zwingli's translation into German printed by Christoph Froschauer, is published.

== Births ==
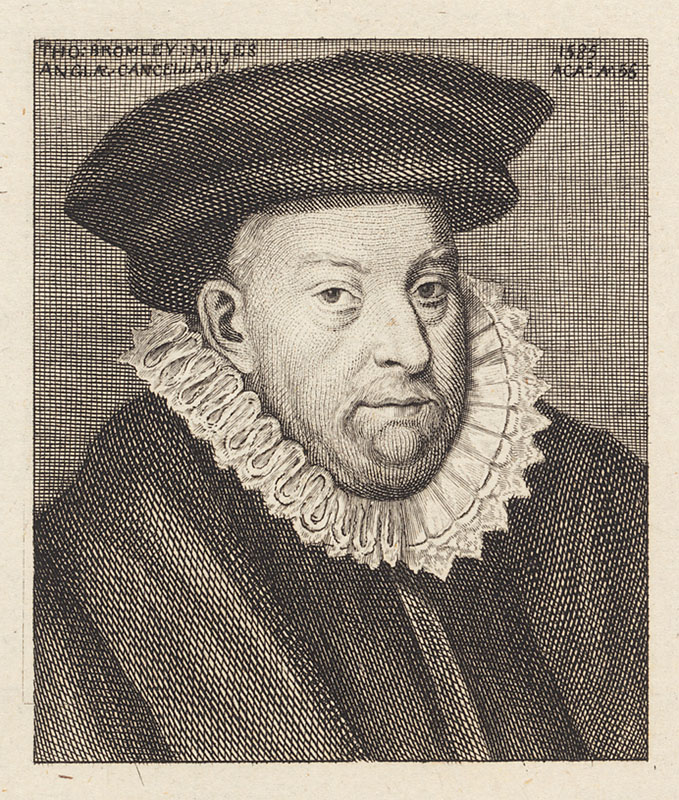
Sir Thomas Bromley

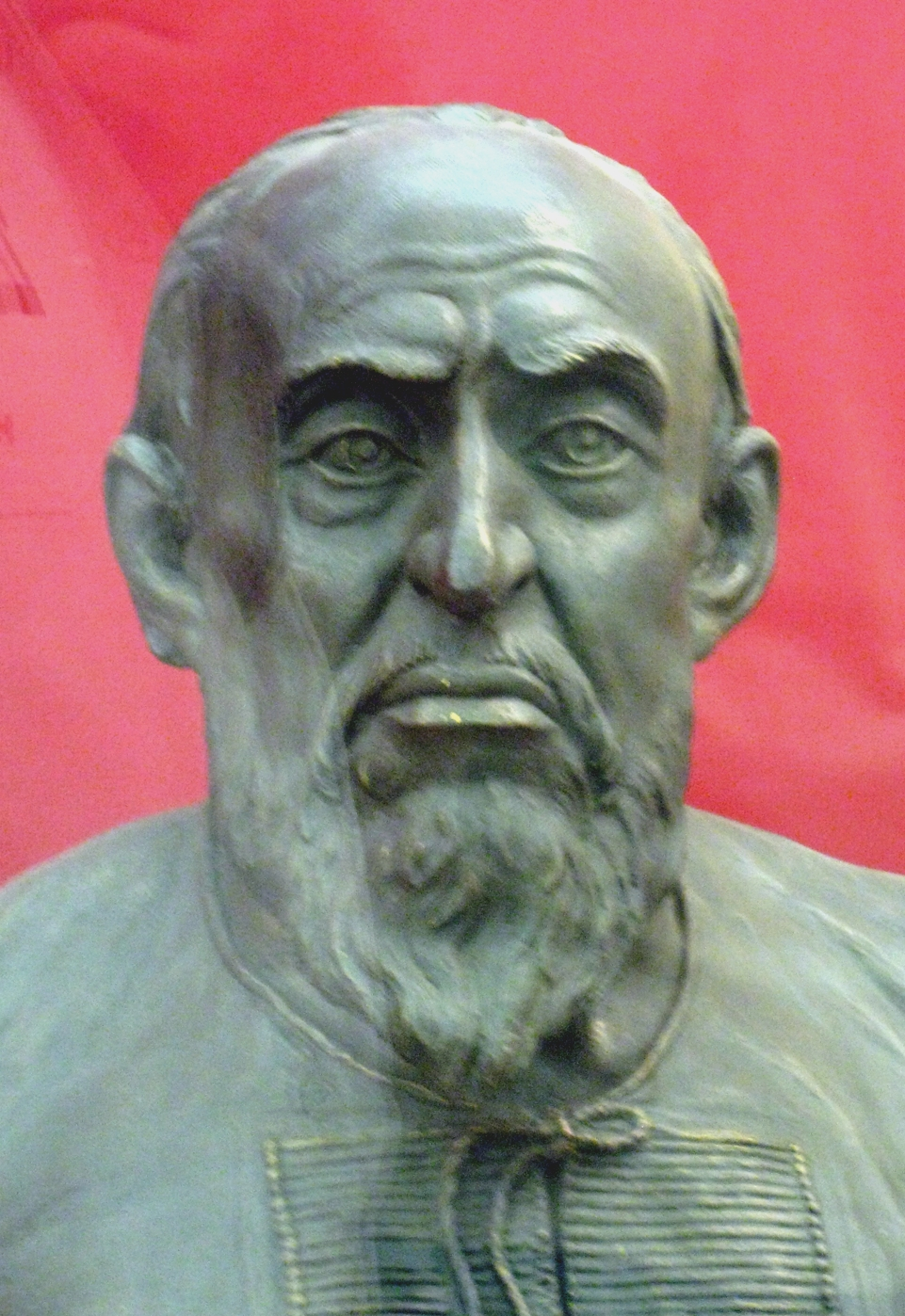
Ivan the Terrible

- January 5 – Gaspar de Bono, Spanish monk of the Order of the Minims (d. 1571)
- January 31 – Ōtomo Sōrin, Japanese Christian Daimyō (d. 1587)
- February 17 – Louis III, Count of Löwenstein (d. 1611)
- February 18 – Uesugi Kenshin, Japanese samurai and warlord (d. 1578)
- February 26 – David Chytraeus, German historian and theologian (d. 1600)
- March 11 – Johann Wilhelm, Duke of Saxe-Weimar (d. 1573)
- May 5 – Gabriel de Lorges, Count of Montgomery, French nobleman (d. 1574)
- May 7 – Louis I, Prince of Condé, French Protestant general (d. 1569)
- June 17 – François de Montmorency, French nobleman (d. 1579)
- June 20 – Johannes Schenck von Grafenberg, German physician (d. 1598)
- June 23 – Jan Kochanowski, Polish writer (d. 1584)
- July 3 – Claude Fauchet, French historian (d. 1602)
- August 1 – Daniel, Count of Waldeck (d. 1577)
- August 11 – Ranuccio Farnese, Italian prelate (d. 1565)
- August 14 – Giambattista Benedetti, Italian mathematician and physicist (d. 1590)
- August 25 – Ivan the Terrible (Ivan IV), Tsar of Russia (d. 1584)
- September 30 – Geronimo Mercuriale, Italian philologist and physician (d. 1606)
- October 1 – Walter Aston, English politician (d. 1589)
- October 21 – Jacques Jonghelinck, Flemish sculptor (d. 1606)
- October 30 – Charles d'Angennes de Rambouillet, Roman Catholic cardinal (d. 1587)
- November 1 – Étienne de La Boétie, French judge and writer (d. 1563)
- November 6 – Josias Simler, Swiss scholar (d. 1576)
- December 1 – Bernardino Realino, Italian Jesuit (d. 1616)
- December 5 – Nikolaus Selnecker, German musician (d. 1592)
- date unknown
  - Julius Caesar Aranzi, Italian anatomist (d. 1589)
  - Vincenza Armani, Italian actress (d. 1569)
  - Christopher Báthory, Prince of Transylvania (d. 1581)
  - Jean Bodin, French jurist (d. 1596)
  - Wawrzyniec Grzymała Goślicki, Polish bishop, political thinker and philosopher (d. 1607)
  - Thomas Hoby, English diplomat and translator (d. 1566)
  - Kōriki Kiyonaga, Japanese daimyō in the Azuchi-Momoyama and Edo periods (d. 1608)
  - Jean Nicot, French diplomat and scholar (d. 1606)
  - Mordecai Yoffe, Bohemian author of Levush Malkhut (d. 1612)
  - Anastasia Romanovna, Russian Tsaritsa (d. 1560)
  - Thomas Bromley, English lord chancellor (d. 1587)
- probable
  - Moses Isserles, Polish rabbi and Talmudist (d. 1572)
  - Claude Le Jeune, French composer (d. 1600)
  - Gráinne O'Malley, Irish ruler (d. 1603)
  - Teodora Ginés, Dominican musician and composer (d. 1598)
  - Shane O'Neill, Irish chieftain and rebel (d. 1567)
  - Turlough Luineach O'Neill, Irish chieftain of Tyrone (d. 1595)
  - Jöran Persson, Swedish politician (d. 1568)
  - Nicholas Sanders, English Catholic propagandist (d. 1581)
  - Ruy López de Segura, Spanish priest and chess player (d. 1580)
  - Pey de Garros, Provençal poet (d. 1585)

== Deaths ==
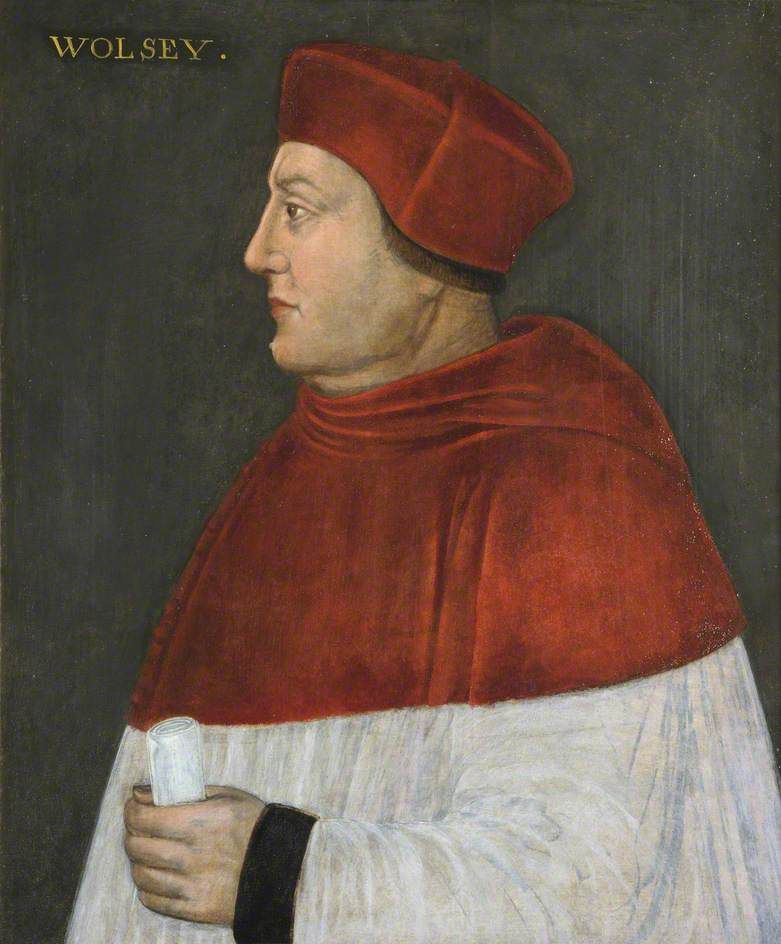
Thomas Wolsey

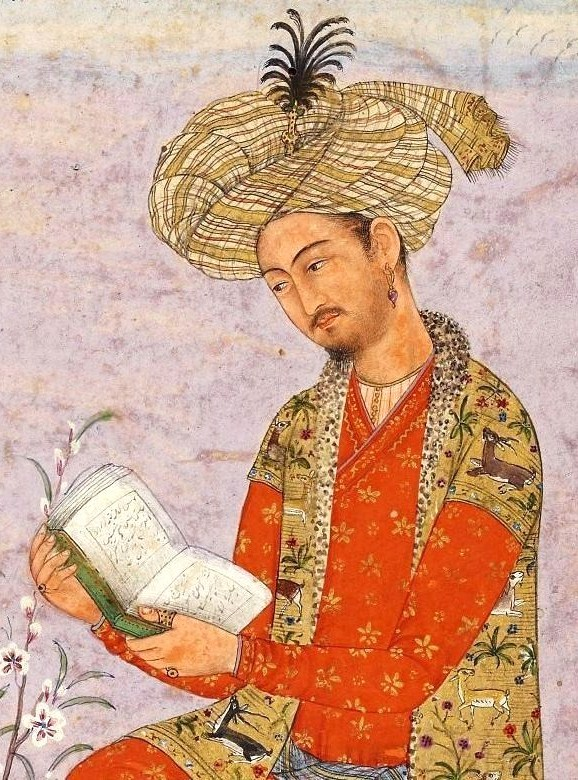
Babur Badshah

- February 7 – Enrique de Cardona y Enríquez, Spanish Catholic cardinal and bishop (b. 1485)
- February 24 – Properzia de' Rossi, Italian Renaissance sculptor (b. c. 1490)
- April 12 – Joanna la Beltraneja, princess of Castile (b. 1462)
- May 3 – Stephen VII Báthory, Hungarian nobleman and military commander
- June 4 – Maximilian Sforza, Duke of Milan (b. 1493)
- June 5 – Mercurino di Gattinara, Italian statesman and jurist (b. 1465)
- June 6 – Boniface IV, Marquess of Montferrat, Italian nobleman (b. 1512)
- June 28 – Margaret of Münsterberg, Duchess consort and regent of Anhalt (b. 1473)
- August 2 – Kanō Masanobu, chief painter of the Ashikaga shogunate (b. 1434)
- August 3 – killed in Battle of Gavinana:
  - Francesco Ferruccio, Florentine captain (b. 1489)
  - Philibert of Chalon, French nobleman (b. 1502)
- August 6 – Jacopo Sannazaro, Italian poet (b. 1458)
- August 10 – Konstanty Ostrogski, Grand Hetman of Lithuania (b. 1460)
- August 28 – Gerold Edlibach, Swiss historian (b. 1454)
- August 29 – Moise of Wallachia
- September 13 – Queen Jeonghyeon, Korean royal consort (b. 1462)
- September 15 – Maria Paleologa, Italian noblewoman (b. 1508)
- October 10 – Thomas Grey, 2nd Marquess of Dorset, English noble (b. 1477)
- November 24 – Mingyi Nyo, founder of the Toungoo Dynasty of Burma (Myanmar) (b. 1459)
- November 29 – Cardinal Thomas Wolsey, British statesman (b. c. 1473)
- December 1 – Margaret of Austria, Regent of the Netherlands (b. 1480)
- December 22 – Willibald Pirckheimer, German humanist (b. 1470)
- December 26 – Babur, founder of the Mughal Empire (b. 1483)
- date unknown
  - Quentin Matsys, Flemish painter (b. 1466)
  - Estienne de La Roche, French mathematician (b. 1470)
  - Søren Norby, Danish naval commander
  - Andrea del Sarto, Italian painter (b. 1487)
