= Noli me tangere (Andrea del Sarto) =

Painting by Andrea del Sarto

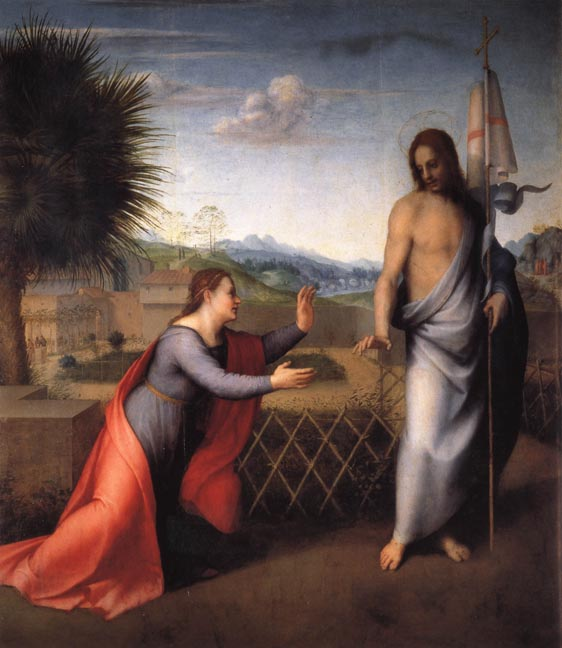
Noli me tangere (c. 1510) by Andrea del Sarto

Noli me tangere is an oil-on-canvas painting by Andrea del Sarto, executed c. 1510, depicting Jesus and Mary Magdalene soon after the resurrection. It was the first painting he produced for the Augustinian San Gallo church in Florence, as recorded by Anonimo Magliabechiano and in Vasari's Lives of the Artists, and he later produced the San Gallo Annunciation and The Disputation on the Trinity for the same church. It is now in the Uffizi.

Noli was commissioned by Leonardo Morelli, as shown by a papal brief of 9 April 1532. During the siege of Florence the monastery's artworks were moved within the city walls to San Jacopo tra i Fossi. The original church outside the walls was razed by Charles V's troops in 1531, but all its chapels were reconstructed at San Jacopo, with Noli ending up in the Morelli chapel. About a third of the painting was underwater during a flood in 1557. The original predella is lost, probably after being damaged in the flood, and replaced by a new one in the late 16th century – the new predella was later removed and is now in the Casa Vasari museum in Arezzo.

The church was suppressed and turned into a barracks in 1849, upon which the Morelli family took back the painting, on the condition that it would remain on public display. However, they did not meet this condition and in 1875 the Italian state took legal action to confiscate the painting, exhibiting it at the Uffizi. Temporarily placed in the museum's stores, the Uffizi's Florentine galleries were reorganised and the work was reassigned to the Museo del Cenacolo di Andrea del Sarto, also in Florence. It remained there until early 2013, when it was returned to the Uffizi upon the redisplay of the latter's Sala di Michelangelo.

Art historians consider the work a product of the artist's youthful phase, when he was strongly influenced by the "school of San Marco" of Fra Bartolomeo and Mariotto Albertinelli.

== Description and style ==
The scene is set in a walled garden, perhaps monastic, depicted with loving care: regular hedges bordered by a trellis and espaliers of fruit shrubs make up the plant elements. An enormous palm, on the left, alludes to the martyrdom suffered by Christ. Small figures in the background allude to other episodes of the days following the Resurrection, such as the three Marys at the sepulcher and the Samaritan woman at the well.

The protagonist figures stand out in the foreground with the Magdalene on the left, kneeling and stretched out, and the risen Jesus on the right, with the Crusader banner. The iconography and the traditional setting, with the horizon line near the center, and the soft and nuanced drawing, derived from the example of Piero di Cosimo, the artist's first master. The monumentality of the figures instead derives from the example of the colleagues active in the convent of San Marco and marks a clear departure from the fifteenth-century modes of the Florentine repertoire. These elements, together with a certain uncertainty in connecting the near and the far in the background, mark the painting as an early work.
