= The Disputation on the Trinity =

1517 painting by Andrea del Sarto

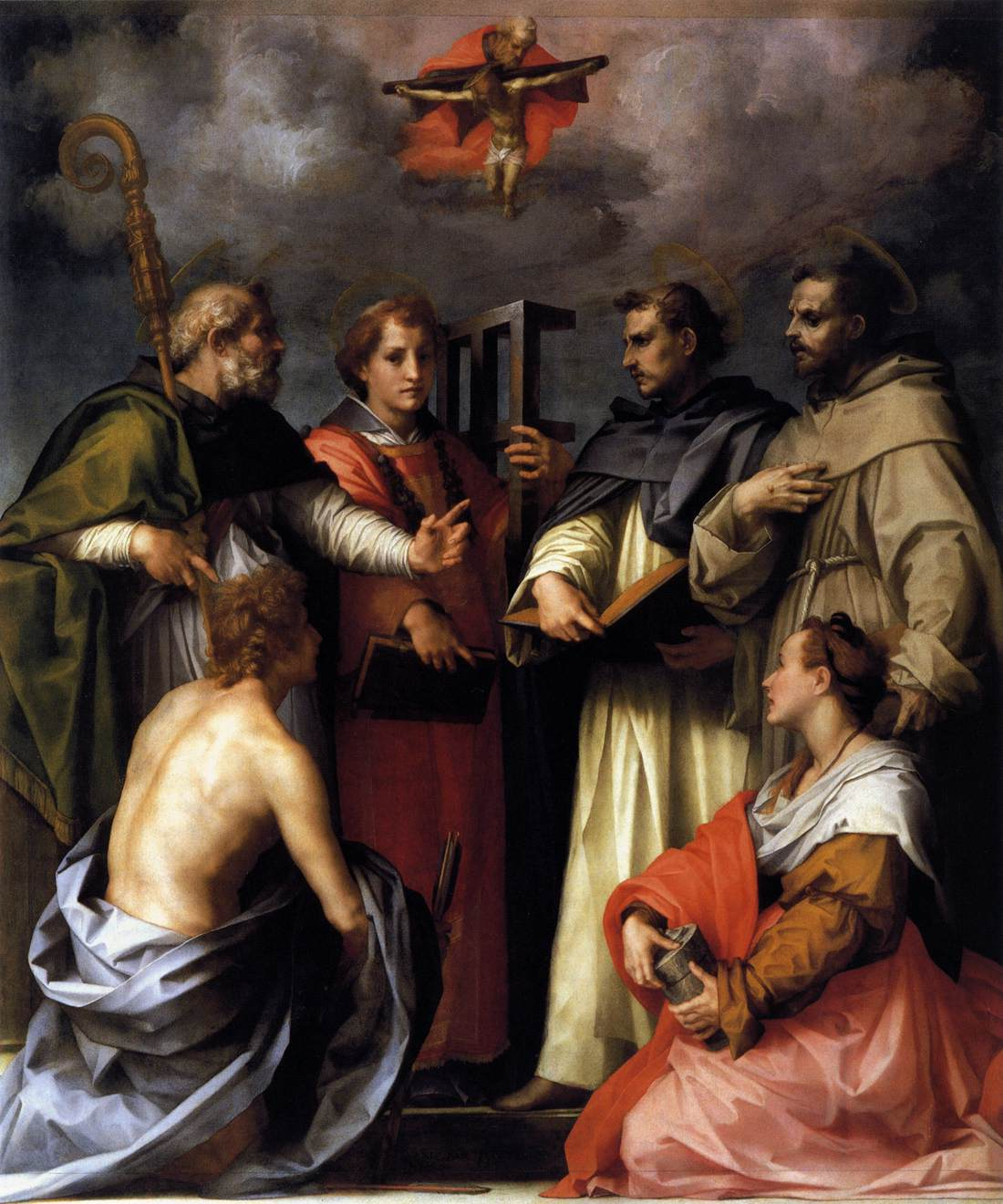
The Disputation of the Trinity (c. 1517) by Andrea del Sarto

The Disputation on the Trinity is an oil-on-canvas painting by the Italian Renaissance artist Andrea del Sarto, created c. 1517, now in the Galleria Palatina in Florence.

At the top of the painting is a vision of the Holy Trinity. Seated in the foreground are Saint Sebastian and Mary Magdalene, the latter modelled on the artist's wife Lucrezia del Fede. Behind them stand four male saints, from left to right Augustine of Hippo (with his bishop's staff), Saint Lawrence (with the gridiron of his martyrdom), Peter Martyr (holding a book, wearing a Dominican habit and with a sword in his head) and Francis of Assisi (in his order's habit and bearing the stigmata).

== History ==
Some art historians argue the work was commissioned by the Peri family due to its inclusion of saints linked to that family. It was the third painting Sarto produced for the Augustinian Church of San Gallo in Florence – the others were the San Gallo Annunciation and a Noli me tangere. All the monastery's goods were moved to the church of San Jacopo tra Fossi for safety in 1529 just before the Siege of Florence. That church was destroyed soon afterwards.

The date painted on the step is a later addition, but Vasari's Lives of the Artists records it was produced after the Madonna of the Harpies (1517), and this dating is generally accepted by comparison with other works from that time. Bocchi's account of the painting states it was damaged in the 1557 flood, but no trace of such damage was found in a 1985 restoration. The work is included in a 17th-century inventory of the Galleria Palatina, spending some time at the Uffizi (1697–1716) before returning decisively to the Galleria Palatina in 1829, where it was hung in the Sala di Saturno.
