= Battle of Landriano =

1529 battle during the War of the League of Cognac

Coordinates: 45.3167°N 9.2667°E

- Part of the War of the League of Cognac
Date	21 June 1529
Location	Landriano, Lombardy (present-day Italy)
Result	Imperial–Spanish victory

Belligerents
Kingdom of France; Republic of Florence; Duchy of Milan	Empire of Charles V: Holy Roman Empire; Spain

Commanders and leaders
Comte de Saint-Pol (POW)	Antonio de Leyva

The Battle of Landriano took place on 21 June 1529, between the French army under Comte de Saint-Pol and the Imperial–Spanish army commanded by Don Antonio de Leyva, Duke of Terranova in the context of the War of the League of Cognac. The French army was destroyed and the battle's strategic result was that the struggle between Francis I of France and Charles V, Holy Roman Emperor for control of northern Italy was temporarily at an end.

== Background ==
In 1528 the Genoese Admiral, Andrea Doria, after deserting in favour of Emperor Charles V, managed to break up the French siege of Naples; his efforts were helped by the plague, which decimated the French besiegers, among them General Odet of Foix, Viscount of Lautrec, who died on 15 August. After his death, the French army was commanded by Giovanni Ludovico of Saluzzo, who, under the circumstances ordered his troops to withdraw on 29 August, but eventually the Imperial–Spanish forces led by Philibert of Châlon, Prince of Orange, caught up with them and decimated them. Shortly after the whole French army in the south of Italy capitulated.

Between August 1528 and June 1529, intense diplomatic activities between King Francis I of France and Holy Roman Emperor Charles V resulted in the Treaty of Barcelona.

Coat of arms of the Comte de Saint-Pol.

== Battle ==
On 21 June 1529 King Francis I still had his troops stationed in Landriano, a region of Lombardy, near Pavia, scene of the decisive confrontation which resulted in a total French defeat in Italy.

The Comte de Saint-Pol's reserve French troops were intercepted and neutralised by the Spanish troops commanded by Don Antonio de Leyva, Duke of Terranova. The French army was destroyed, which ended Francis's hopes of regaining his hold on Italy. The French commander, Saint-Pol, was also captured, leaving the Duchy of Milan under the complete control of the Emperor.

Hostilities continued however, although without any French participation, with the Imperial–Spanish army led by Philibert of Châlon, Prince of Orange, against the Republic of Florence and installing Alessandro de' Medici as the ruler of Florence.

== Aftermath ==
With France's defeat in Landriano and the Treaty of Barcelona, Francis I of France felt obliged to begin negotiations with the Emperor.

On 3 August, the King of France's mother, Louise of Savoy, and the Emperor's aunt, Margaret of Austria, signed the Treaty of Cambrai. Francis obtained the restitution of his sons, but on the condition that he had to abandon Italy, persuade the Venetians and the Duke of Ferrara to restore the occupied lands to the Emperor and Pope Clement VII, not to interfere in the affairs of Italy and Germany, and to cooperate in the fight against the Protestants, to provide compensation of 200,000 ducats and send 4 ships, 12 galleys and 4 galleons for when the Emperor planned to go to Italy for his coronation.

The Treaty made no reference to the Duchy of Burgundy, evening out with this silence the humiliating situation that was put to Francis in the Treaty of Madrid.

== See also ==
- Siege of Florence (1529–30)
- List of governors of the Duchy of Milan
