= Siege of Florence (1529–1530) =

Successful Habsburg siege of Florence

Coordinates: 43.7833°N 11.2500°E

- Part of the War of the League of Cognac
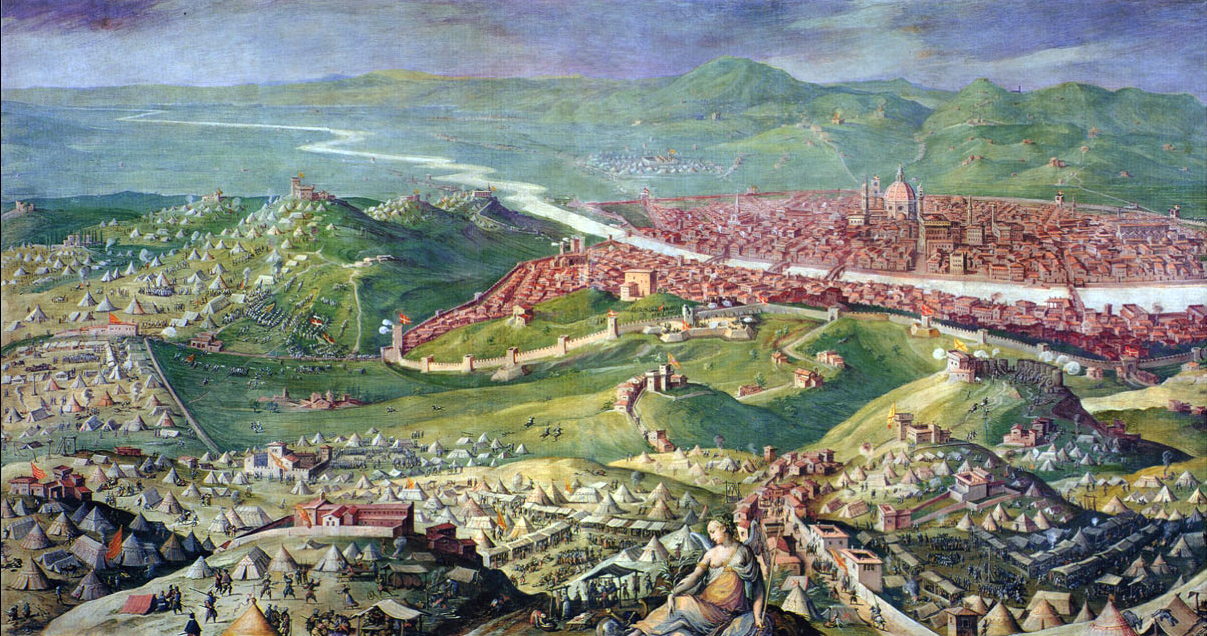
- The Siege of Florence by Giorgio Vasari, 1558
| Date | 24 October 1529 – 10 August 1530 |
| Location | Florence, Italy |
| Result | Habsburg-Papal victory |

Belligerents
| Republic of Florence | Holy Roman Empire; Habsburg Spain; Papal States |

Commanders and leaders
| Francesco Ferrucci †; Malatesta Baglioni | Philibert of Orange †; Pier Maria III de' Rossi; Ferrante I Gonzaga |

The siege of Florence took place from 24 October 1529 to 10 August 1530, at the end of the War of the League of Cognac. At the Congress of Bologna, the Medici Pope Clement VII and Emperor Charles V agreed to restore the Medici family in Florence. A large Imperial and Spanish army under Philibert of Châlon, Prince of Orange and Pier Maria III de' Rossi surrounded the city and after a siege of nearly ten months, captured it. They overthrew the Republic of Florence and installed Alessandro de' Medici as the ruler of the city.

The Florentines had thrown off Medici rule and established a republic after the Sack of Rome in 1527; the Florentine Republic had continued to participate in the war on the side of the French. The French defeats at Naples in 1528 and Landriano in 1529, however, led to Francis I of France concluding the Treaty of Cambrai with the Holy Roman Emperor Charles V. When Pope Clement VII and the Republic of Venice also concluded treaties with the Emperor, Florence was left to fight alone. Charles, attempting to gain Clement's favor, ordered his armies to seize Florence and return the Medici to power.

The Republic resisted this incursion; but, left without allies and betrayed by many of the mercenaries in her employ, Florence was unable to keep fighting indefinitely. After the capture of Volterra by the Imperial forces and the death of Francesco Ferruccio at the Battle of Gavinana, further resistance became impractical, and the city surrendered in August 1530.

== Prelude ==
At the conclusion of the Treaty of Bologna in the summer of 1529, Charles and Clement, the father of Alessandro de' Medici began to plan an offensive against the Florentine Republic. The Prince of Orange arrived in Rome at the end of July; there, he was given some 30,000 ducats (with promises of additional funds later) by the Pope, and ordered to attack Perugia (which was held by Malatesta Baglioni) and Florence. The Prince of Orange was able to collect some 7,000 infantry, mostly the remnants of the landsknechts which had followed Georg Frundsberg into Italy in 1526 as well as various Italian companies no longer employed due to the denouement of the war. Florence, meanwhile, was preparing to resist the attack, raising nearly 10,000 militia and demolishing the parts of the city outside the walls.

The Prince of Orange proceeded towards Florence, gathering additional troops along the way. He was hampered by a lack of artillery, and was forced to requisition some from Siena. The Siennese, having little love for the Pope, provided it; but they delayed its arrival as long as they could. By 24 September the Imperial forces were still in Montevarchi, twenty-five miles from Florence, waiting for the promised cannon.

In Florence, meanwhile, confusion reigned. The Council of Ten urged surrendering to Clement; the gonfaloniere adamantly refused, and demanded that defensive works continue. A number of condottieri which the Republic had earlier hired refused to take the field against the Emperor. After Firenzuola was sacked by troops in Imperial pay, many of Florence's most prominent citizens fled. Among these was Michelangelo Buonarroti, the artist and architect, who had been placed in command of the fortification of the city; departing on 10 September after having fruitlessly warned the gonfaloniere that Malatesta Baglioni would betray the city, he would nevertheless return in mid-November to take up his post once again, in which capacity he would continue to serve until the end of the siege.

In preparations for the defense of the city, a number of outlying convents and monasteries were destroyed, including the convent church of San Giovanni Evangelista, the Church of San Gallo outside the Porta San Gallo, the convents of Monte Domini and Monticelli, the Camaldolese monastery of San Benedetto fuori della Porta Pinti, San Donato in Polverosa, and San Giusto degli Ingesuati, together with its frescoes by Pietro Perugino. Other works painted for San Giusto by Perugino, along with its altarpiece by Domenico Ghirlandaio, are preserved in the Uffizi.

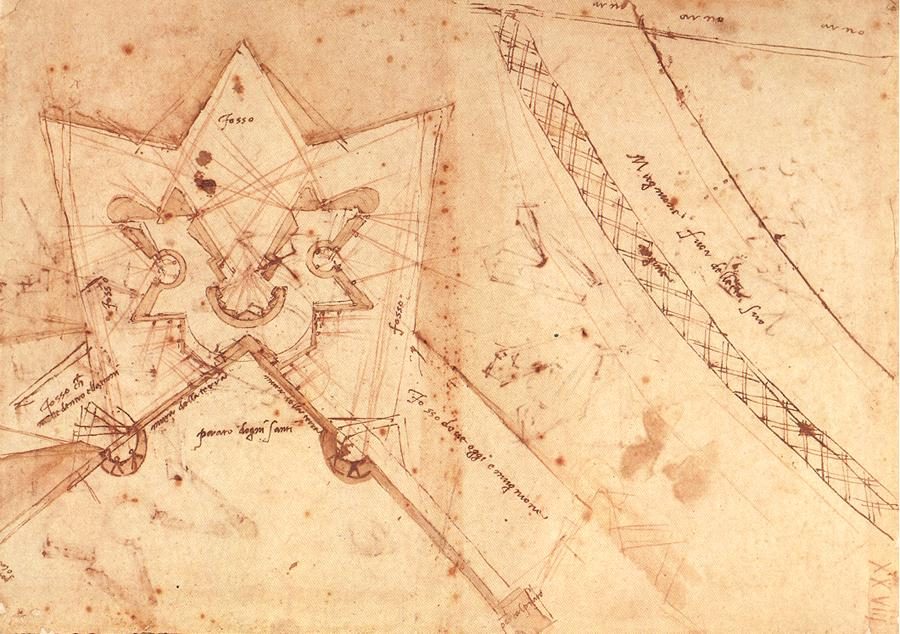
Study of Fortification for the Porta al Prato of Ognissanti by Michelangelo Buonarroti 1529–1530. Michelangelo served as Governor of Fortifications through the duration of the siege.

== Siege ==
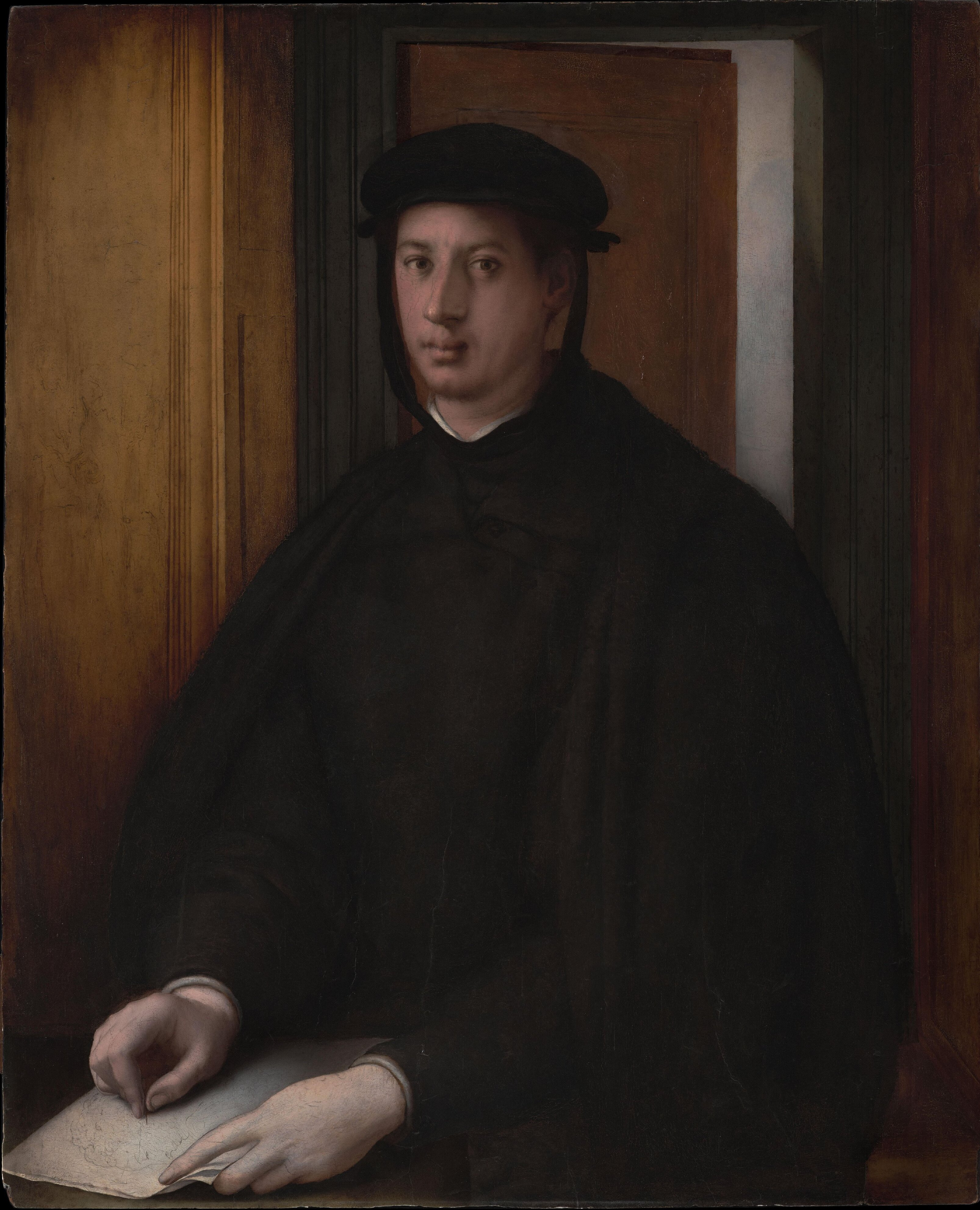
Portrait of Alessandro de' Medici. Oil on canvas by Jacopo Pontormo 1534–1535. The victorious Imperial–Spanish troops installed Alessandro as Duke of Florence.

The significant progress made on the fortifications, and the delays in the Imperial movement, strengthened the city's resolve to fight. On 5 October, The Prince of Orange resumed his march; by 24 October he had encamped his army on the hills around Florence. The city was garrisoned by some 8,000 soldiers of various kinds. Viewing the Florentine earthworks too substantial to easily take by assault, the Imperial army settled into a pattern of artillery duels and skirmishing with the defenders instead. Meanwhile, the lack of fighting in other portions of Italy drew thousands of unemployed soldiers to the Imperial army, substantially swelling its ranks; the new arrivals included Fabrizio Maramaldo, whose reputation for brutality was such that even Clement opposed allowing him to take part in the siege.

The promises of aid the Florentines had received from Francis I of France were revealed to have been overstated. Although his sons had been released from Madrid, Francis did not wish to openly challenge Charles so soon. While he did provide some sums of money to the Florentine merchants—money that, apparently, he had owed to them to begin with—he did not send any troops to relieve Florence, as he had promised.

The focus of the fighting then shifted to the town of Volterra, which commanded the lines of communication to Florence, and whose citadel was still in Florentine hands. The Imperial forces attacked Volterra; the Florentines responded by dispatching Francesco Ferruccio, the commander of the garrison at Empoli, to relieve it. Ferruccio easily overran the Imperial troops; but, defying the orders of the Council of Ten, which called for him to remain in Volterra, he marched back to Empoli with the majority of his troops. This allowed a second, more successful Imperial assault to take place after his departure.

With the loss of Volterra, Florentine hopes of opening a supply line into the city dwindled, and Florence looked to the arrival of Ferruccio with a relief army, which he had gathered around Pisa. The Prince of Orange, having arranged that Baglioni would not attack the Imperial forces in his absence, marched out with the larger portion of his army to intercept him. On 3 August 1530 the two armies met at the Battle of Gavinana; both The Prince of Orange and Ferruccio were killed, and the Florentine forces were decisively defeated.

=== Calcio ===
The city held a match of calcio on February 17, 1530, in defiance of the imperial troops. The "noble game" was played in Piazza Santa Croce, only by distinguished soldiers, lords, noblemen and princes.

== Aftermath ==
Despite the attempts of some citizens to continue the resistance—as well as infighting within the city government—Florence could not hold out with Ferruccio's army destroyed. On 10 August the representatives of the Republic surrendered to the Imperial forces. Baglioni and the remainder of his troops abandoned the city, and the Medici returned to power. Over the next few months, many of the Republic's leaders were executed or banished.
