= Church of San Gallo =

15th-century Italian church

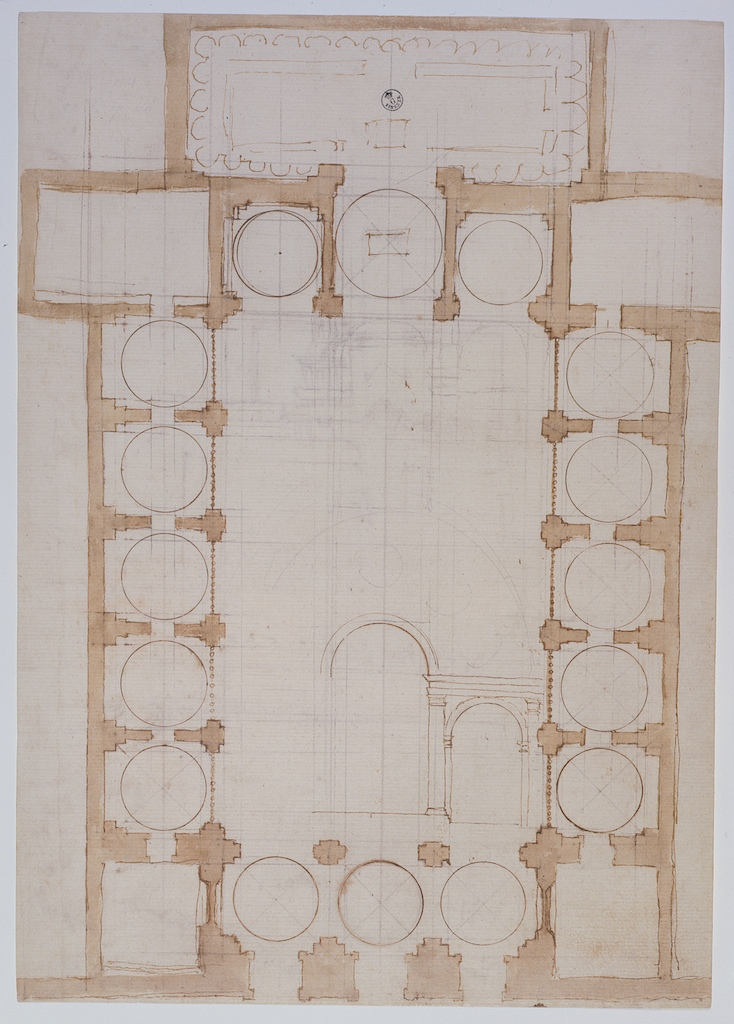
Church of San Gallo: Giuliano da Sangallo's architectural drawing (1488)

Church of San Gallo was a 15th-century church designed by architect Giuliano da Sangallo. The church was built outside of the city walls of Florence; it was destroyed during the Siege of Florence (1529–1530).

== Background ==
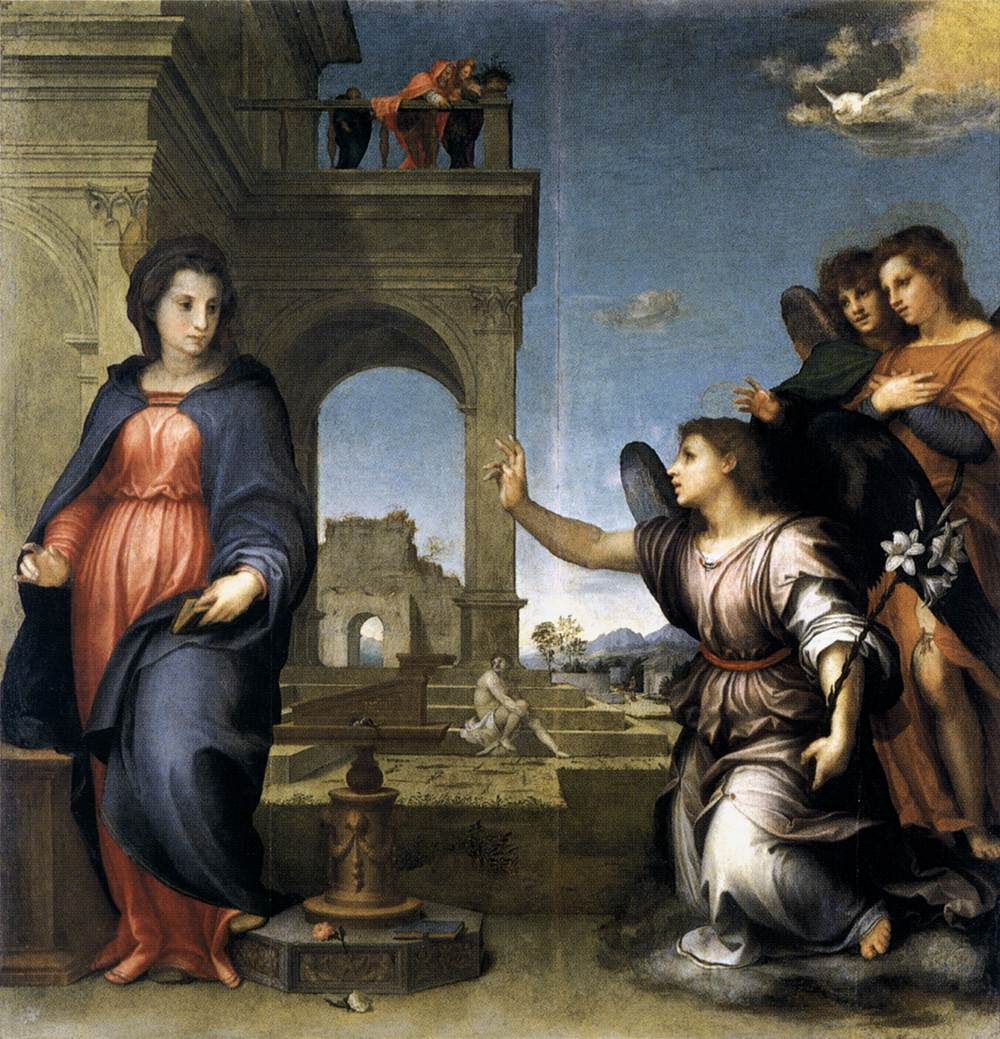
Andrea del Sarto 1513 - San Gallo Annunciation was displayed in the church

Lorenzo de' Medici commissioned Giuliano da Sangallo to design a monastery of Austin Friars outside the gate of San Gallo. One Architectural drawings for the building survived and it shows Architrave and Pilasters. This commission was meant to be used as an example of Medici family public patronage in Florence.

== History ==
Based on correspondences during that time, historians have inferred that construction began on the church in 1488. The architect Giuliano got his name (San Gallo) from the church. In addition to the architect's last name, the gate in the Florence city wall closest to the church took on the San Gallo name: it was called Porta San Gallo. During the 1529 Siege of Florence, the Florentine army retreated within the walls of the city. The church was built outside of the city walls, and because of that it was destroyed during the siege.

The church displayed religious artwork. Before the church was abandoned and destroyed the art was removed and relocated inside the city's walls. The Disputation on the Trinity and the San Gallo Annunciation by Andrea del Sarto were two of the paintings taken inside the city of Florence walls.
