= War of the League of Cognac =

Seventh phase of the Italian Wars (1526–1530)

- Part of the French–Habsburg rivalry and the Italian Wars
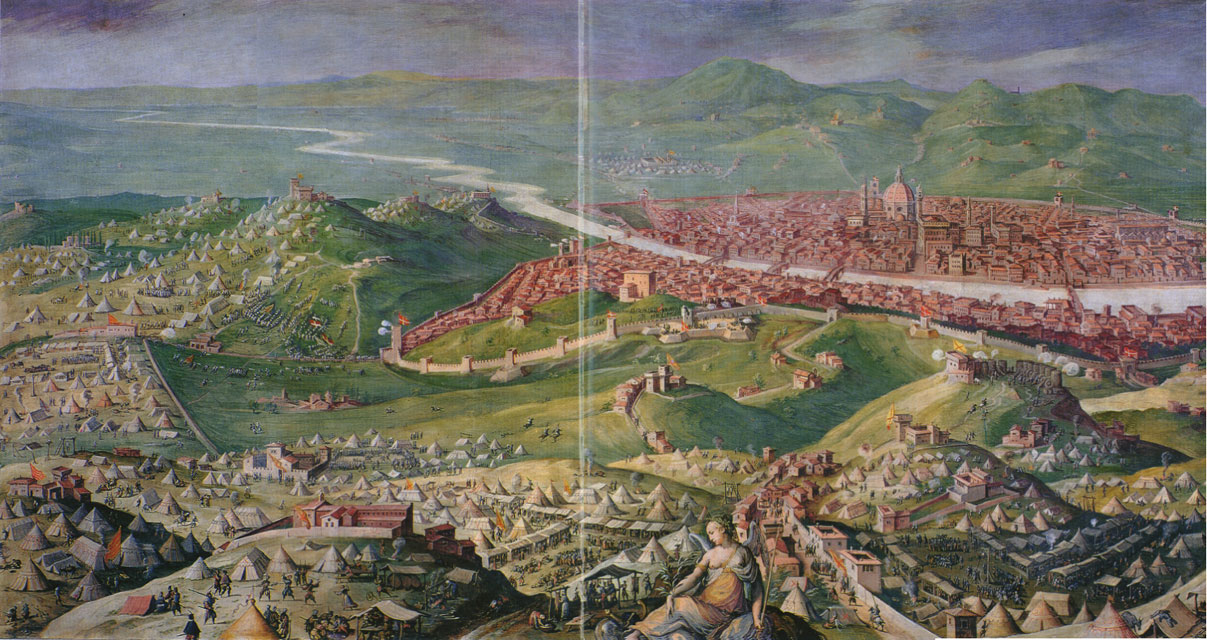
- Siege of Florence, 1530, fought during the War of the League of Cognac
Date	1526–1530
Location	Italy
Result	Habsburg victory: Treaty of Cambrai (1529); End of the Florentine Republic (1530); Transformation of Florence into a hereditary monarchy by Pope Clement VII (1532)

Belligerents
Pro-Habsburg: Holy Roman Empire; Habsburg Spain; Duchy of Ferrara; Margraviate of Mantua; Republic of Genoa (1526-1527, 1528–1530); Papal States(after 1530)	League of Cognac: Kingdom of France; Papal States(1526-1529); (Old Swiss Confederacy) Swiss Guards; Duchy of Urbino; Duchy of Milan; Republic of Venice; Republic of Florence; Republic of Genoa (1527–1528)

Commanders and leaders
(Holy Roman Empire) (Spain) Charles V; (Holy Roman Empire) Charles III, Duke of Bourbon †; (Spain) Antonio de Leyva; (Holy Roman Empire) Philibert of Châlon †; (Holy Roman Empire) Henry of Brunswick-Lüneburg; (Holy Roman Empire) Georg Frundsberg; (Holy Roman Empire) Ferrante Gonzaga	(Kingdom of France) Francis I; (Kingdom of France) Francis de Bourbon, Count of St. Pol; (Kingdom of France) Odet de Foix, Viscount of Lautrec †; Francesco Maria I della Rovere; Giovanni delle Bande Nere; Alfonso I d'Este; (Republic of Florence) Francesco Ferruccio †; (Republic of Venice) (Republic of Florence) Malatesta IV Baglioni

The War of the League of Cognac (1526–1530) was fought between the Habsburg dominions of Emperor Charles V—chiefly the Holy Roman Empire and Spain—and the League of Cognac, an alliance comprising the Kingdom of France, Pope Clement VII, the Republic of Venice, the Duchy of Milan and the Republic of Florence, later joined by the Kingdom of England. The war is best known for the Sack of Rome by the Emperor's unpaid troops in 1527, an event that some historians regard as the end of the Italian Renaissance. France withdrew from the war under the Treaty of Cambrai in 1529, and the League's last holdout, Florence, fell in 1530. This cemented Habsburg dominance over the Italian Peninsula.

== Prelude ==
Alarmed by the French defeat in the Italian War of 1521, Pope Clement VII and the Republic of Venice set about building an alliance to drive Charles V from the Italian Peninsula. Francis I of France, who had been made prisoner at Pavia, and having signed the Treaty of Madrid and left his two eldest sons in Spain as surety for its terms, was released from his captivity in Madrid. Upon his return to France, he promptly repudiated the treaty, claiming that it had been signed under duress, and declared his intention to assist the Pope in this endeavor.

Thus, on 22 May 1526, the League of Cognac was formed in the eponymous French town. Its members were the French king, who wanted to avenge his humiliating defeat by Charles; the Pope, whose authority had been challenged regarding the allocation of benefices in Spain and Naples, the republics of Venice and Florence, which feared a larger-scale Imperial invasion of the Italian peninsula, and Francesco II Sforza, Duke of Milan, whose domain was under Imperial military occupation. Henry VIII of England, thwarted in his desire to have the treaty signed in England, refused to join the alliance.

== Initial moves ==
War became imminent, and a month after its formation, the League swiftly seized the town of Lodi, but Imperial troops marched into Lombardy, laid siege to the Castello Sforzesco, and before long forced Sforza to abandon Milan. In the meantime, the Viceroy of Naples, conspiring with the powerful cardinal Pompeo Colonna to exploit the Papacy's momentary weakness, mounted an attack upon Rome. In September 1526 they defeated the Papal forces and briefly held the city, withdrawing only after being paid off.

== Sack of Rome ==
The Pope’s vacillations stalled the progress of the League, as the cautious papal and Venetian armies preferred to wait for the French troops—a delay that allowed for the arrival of further Imperial reinforcements. Nevertheless, Francis I succeeded in securing an agreement with Henry VIII through the Treaty of Westminster in April 1527; this treaty guaranteed English neutrality and diplomatic support—though not troops—thanks to the intervention of the Spanish ambassador, Íñigo López de Mendoza y Zúñiga.

Charles V gathered a force of 14,000 German landsknechte and 6,000 Spanish soldiers led respectively by Georg Frundsberg and the Duke of Bourbon; the two hosts merged at Piacenza and advanced towards Rome. Francesco Guicciardini, then in command of the Papal armies, proved unable to thwart their progress; when Bourbon fell in the assault, the underpaid Imperial troops mutinied and sacked the city. The Pope took refuge in the Castel Sant'Angelo, his flight made possible by the Swiss Guards' last stand.

== Lautrec's expedition and the siege of Naples ==
The sack of Rome, which effectively removed the Pope from any active role in the war, prompted frantic action on the part of the French. In August 1527 a French army under the Viscount of Lautrec and the Count of Oliveto, descended into Italy; with the aid of Andrea Doria, who upon the expiry of his contract with the Pope had returned to the service of France, it wrested Genoa from its pro-Imperial doge, Antoniotto Adorno, and took possession of the greater part of the Genoese fleet. The French went on to reduce Alessandria and Savona, and on 5 October they sacked Pavia. Passing through the Papal cities of Piacenza and Parma, they reached Bologna, whence they set out for Naples on 10 January 1528, supported by the newly restored Florentine republic; by 29 January they had arrived at the Sanctuary of the Holy House at Loreto.

Meanwhile, in December 1527, the Pope, who had remained a prisoner at Castel Sant'Angelo since the sack, made his escape upon the approach of the French and withdrew to Orvieto.

In February 1528 the Imperial army quartered in Rome set out southward, followed by the French, who laid siege to Naples on 29 April and to Catanzaro in May. Doria, whose galleys held the Bay of Naples, and who felt aggrieved by delayed payments, defected, for the service of Charles upon the expiry of his contract, withdrawing his ships. Both sieges collapsed when plague broke out in the French camps, carrying off the greater part of the army together with Lautrec and Oliveto, and the remnant of the French forces capitulated at Aversa in August 1528.

== Collapse of the French campaign ==
Doria then took the offensive at Genoa, where he soon broke the blockade of the city and forced the surrender of the French garrison at Savona. The final blow fell on 21 June 1529, when a French relieving army under the Count of Saint-Pol was decisively defeated at Landriano, putting an end to Francis's hopes of recovering his position in Italy.

== Barcelona, Cambrai, and Bologna ==
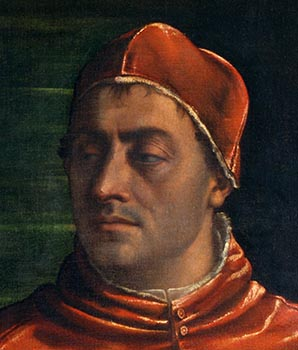
Pope Clement VII

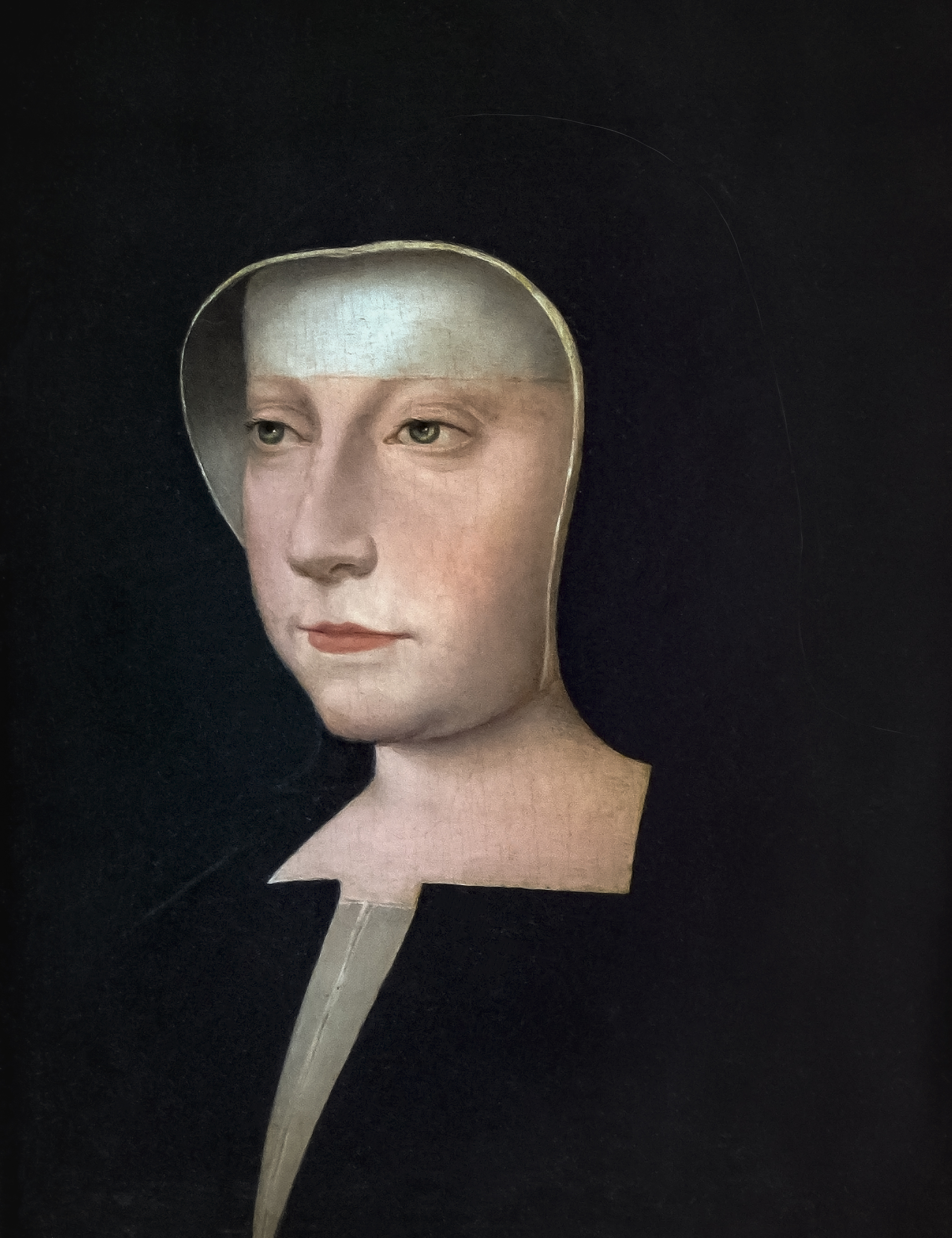
Louise of Savoy

His armies defeated, Francis sought terms with the Emperor, who had shortly before sailed from Barcelona for Italy after signing the Treaty of Barcelona with the Pope. Negotiations began in July 1529 in the border city of Cambrai, and were conducted primarily by two women: Francis's mother, Louise of Savoy, on behalf of France, and her sister-in-law, Margaret of Austria, on behalf of her nephew the Emperor; whence the treaty came to be known as the Paix des Dames ("Peace of the Ladies"). The final terms largely mirrored those of the Treaty of Madrid three years earlier: Francis renounced his claims to Artois, Flanders, and Tournai, and was obliged to pay a ransom of two million gold écuss for the release of his sons from their captivity in Madrid. Removed, however, were both the humiliating surrender of Burgundy itself and the various points dealing with the Duke of Bourbon, whose death two years prior extinguished any prospect of his being made an independent ruler of Provence. The final Treaty of Cambrai, signed on 3 August, withdrew France from the war, leaving Venice and Florence alone against the Imperial forces.

Charles, having landed at Genoa, proceeded to Bologna to confer with the Pope. Clement granted absolution to those who had taken part in the sack of Rome and promised to crown Charles both King of Naples and Holy Roman Emperor. In return, he received Ravenna and Cervia from Venice, which was further compelled to surrender her remaining possessions in Apulia to the Emperor in exchange for being permitted to retain the holdings she had won at Marignano. Francesco Sforza was permitted to return to Milan—Charles having abandoned his earlier design to make Alessandro de' Medici Duke, in part due to Venetian objections—upon payment of 900,000 scudi. Finally, in November the Venetians signed a peace treaty with the Emperor, ceding Brindisi, Mola di Bari, Monopoli, Polignano a Mare and Trani to the Spanish.

== Fall of the Florentine Republic ==
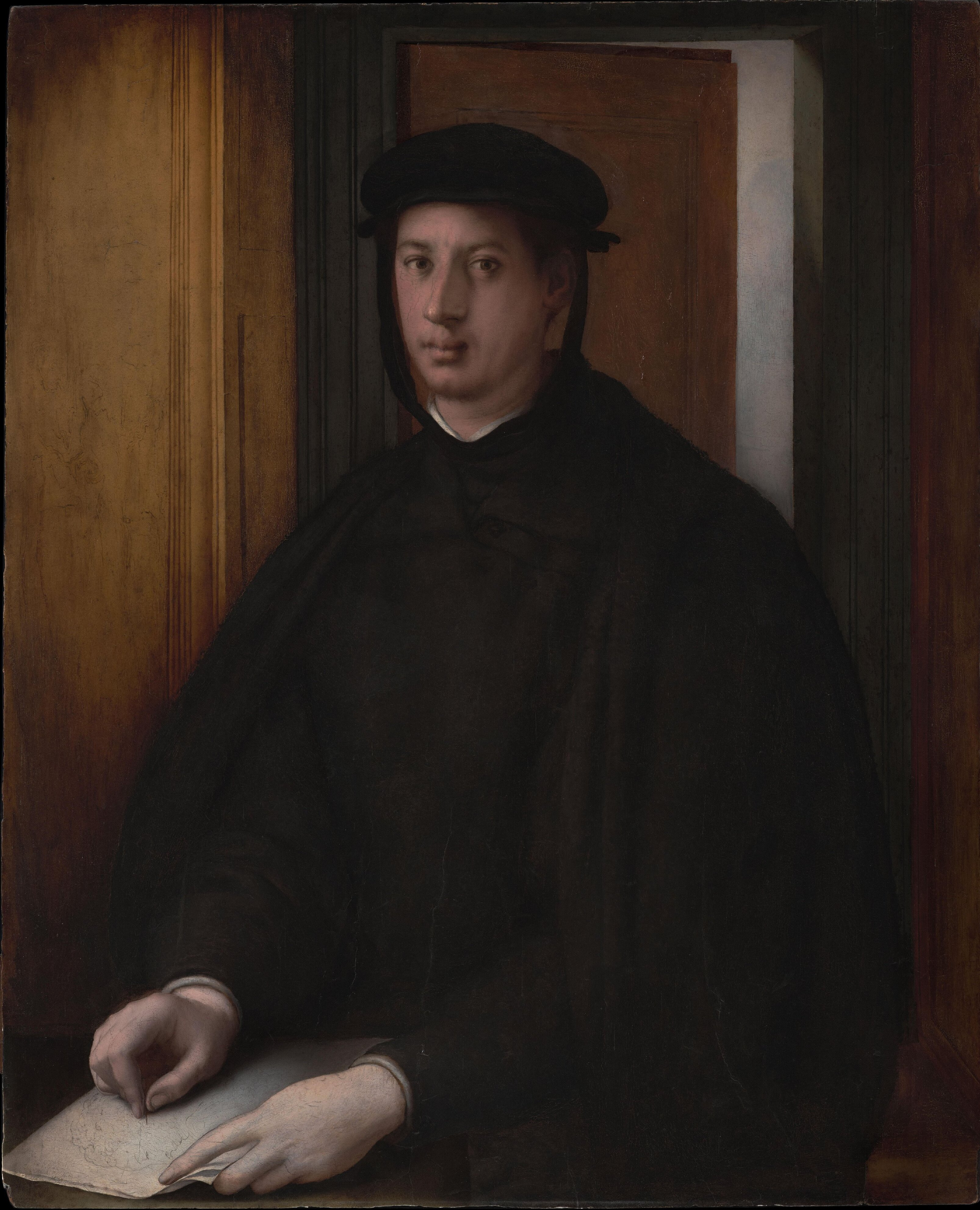
Alessandro de' Medici was installed as ruler of Florence by the victorious Imperial troops.

The Republic of Florence alone continued to resist the Imperial forces, which were led by the Prince of Orange. In 1530 a Florentine host under Francesco Ferruccio engaged the armies of the Emperor at Gavinana, and, although the Prince of Orange himself was slain, the Imperial army won a decisive victory and the Republic capitulated ten days afterwards. The Pope subsequently installed Alessandro de' Medici as Duke of Florence, which thenceforth remained a hereditary possession of the Medici; its centuries-old republican government thus brought to an end.
