= Malatesta IV Baglioni =

Italian condottiero

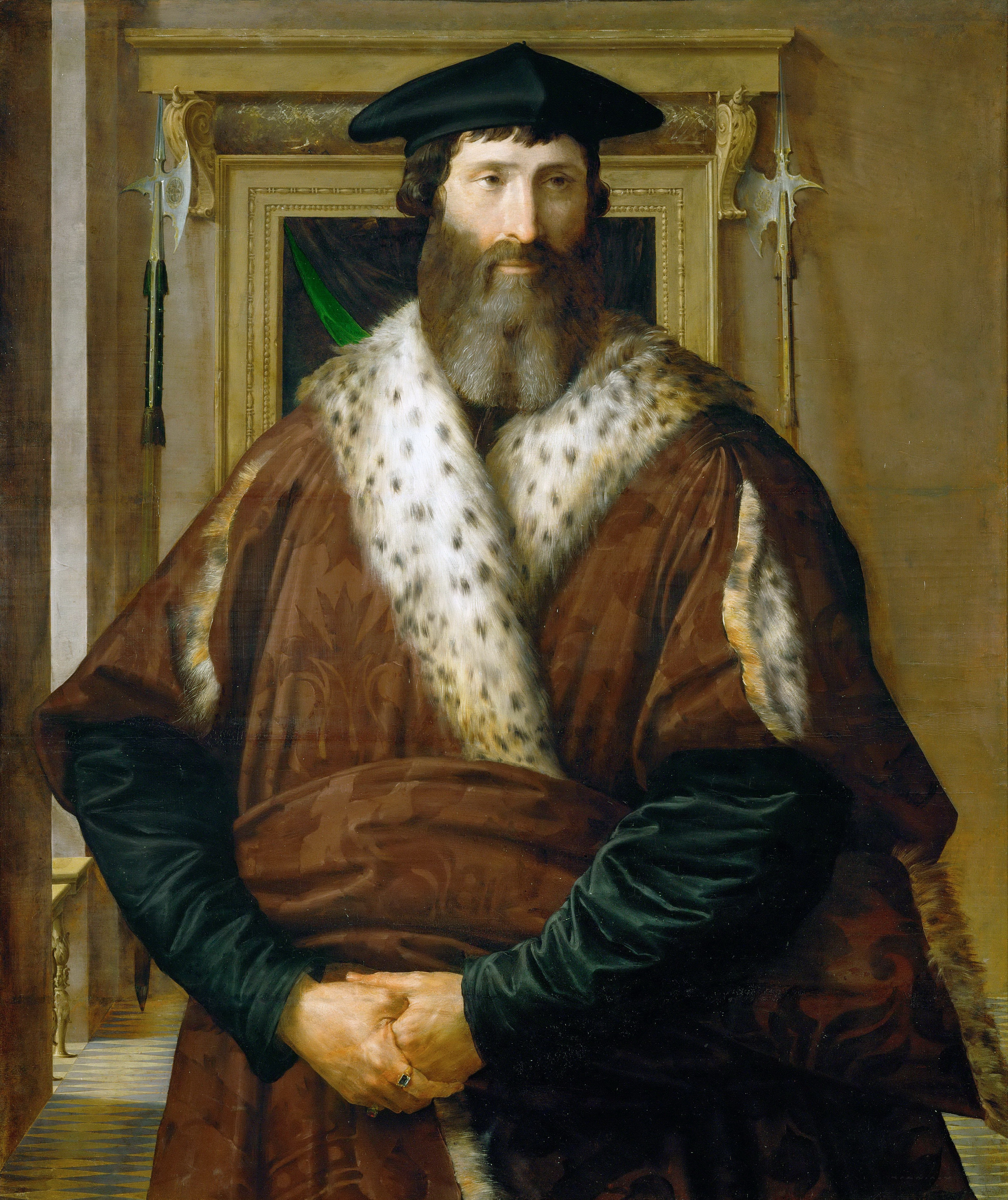
- Parmigianino 015

Lord of Perugia
- In office 1527–1531
- Preceded by: Gentile I Baglioni

Count of Spello and Bettona
- In office 1527–1531
- Preceded by: Giampaolo Baglioni
- Succeeded by: Rodolfo Baglioni

Personal details
- Born: 1491 Perugia, Papal States
- Died: 24 December 1531 (aged 39–40) Bettona, Papal States
- Relatives: Baglioni

Military service
- Battles/wars: Battle of Gavinana

Malatesta IV Baglioni (1491 – 24 December 1531) was an Italian condottiero and lord of Perugia, count of Bettona and Spello, and other lands in Umbria.

== Biography ==
He was the son of Gian Paolo Baglioni, ruler of Perugia, and Ippolita Conti. He followed his father in his ventures from a very early age, and at fifteen he was count of Bettona. Later, in the course of the Italian Wars, he served the Republic of Venice, capturing Lodi and Cremona. In 1527 he was able to obtain the seignory of Perugia, after eliminating his brother and his uncle.

During the War of the League of Cognac, Malatesta left Perugia to Philibert of Orange, chief of the Imperial army in Italy, to assume the defence of the Republic of Florence. A secret agreement with Pope Clement VII and the Imperials stated that he would receive the city back after his condotta for Florence ended.

His treason was revealed on 3 August 1530, at the Battle of Gavinana, in which the Florentine force under Francesco Ferrucci was destroyed by the Imperial army. Ferrucci's exclamation: "Ahi traditor Malatesta!" has remained famous. Baglioni was thus able to return to Perugia on 20 September.

He died in Bettona the following year.
