= San Gallo Annunciation =

Painting by Andrea del Sarto in the Palazzo Pitti

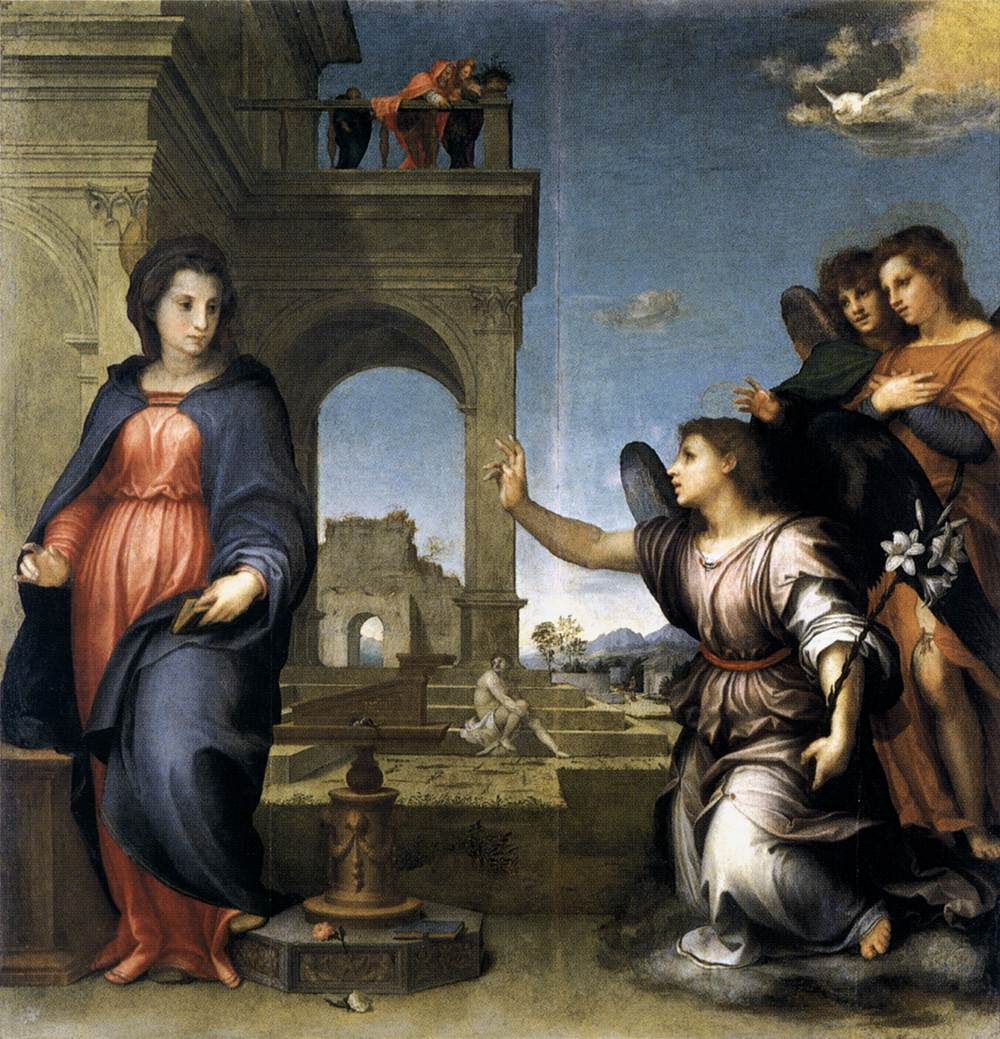
San Gallo Annunciation (c. 1513–1514)

The San Gallo Annunciation is an oil-on-panel painting by Andrea del Sarto, executed c. 1513–1514, now in the Palatine Gallery in Florence.

It was the middle of three works the artist produced for the Augustinian monastery the Church of San Gallo in Florence, between Noli me tangere and The Disputation on the Trinity, as recorded in the Anonimo Magliabechiano manuscript and in Vasari's Lives of the Artists. When Florence was besieged, that monastery's goods were moved to San Jacopo tra i Fossi within the city walls and its buildings razed in 1531 by Charles V's troops. The monastery rebuilt all its chapels at its new site in their former form. About a third of the painting was submerged in the 1557 flood, probably leading to the loss of the predella, though in 1986 (Serena?) Padovani theorised that that predella wholly or partly survived and is now divided up between the National Gallery of Ireland and Warwick Castle.

Stylistically its monumental figures show the influence of Fra Bartolomeo and the San Marco school, both major influences on Andrea del Sarto's early career, whilst the colouring is heavily influenced by Leonardo da Vinci and the compositional liberty by Piero di Cosimo.

Art historians have not agreed on the identity of the figures standing on the balcony in the background. Alessandro Conti suggested in 1968 that they are David and Bathsheba; Petrioli Tofani said in 1985 that the figures are Susannah and the Elders; and Antonio Natali said in 1989 that they are Adam and Eve, in reference to Augustinian exegesis.
