= Fabrizio Maramaldo =

Italian Condottiero

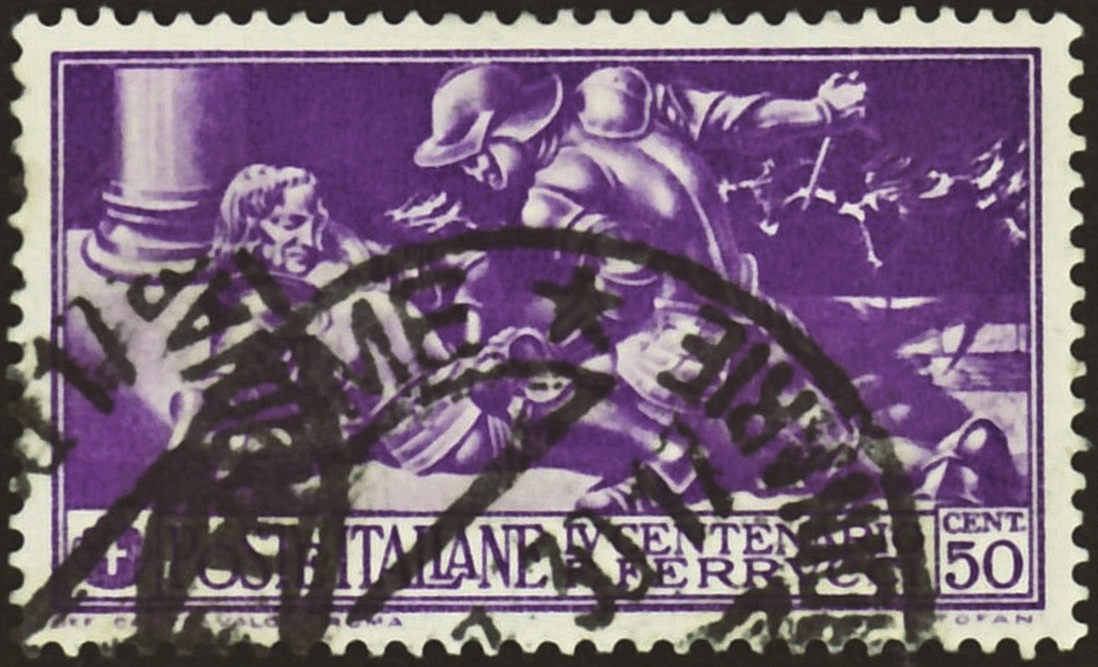
Maramaldo killing Ferrucci, Italian postal stamp, 10 July 1930

Fabrizio Maramaldo (1494—December 1552) was an Italian Condottiero. A native of Naples or Calabria, his exact origins are unknown, though he hailed from the Kingdom of Naples, and was perhaps of Spanish origin. He fled Naples after having murdered his wife and sought protection at the Gonzaga under Federico II, Duke of Mantua, and in the Republic of Venice. In 1526 he was absolved of the crime of uxoricide by Charles V, the Holy Roman Emperor. He fought the Ottomans in Hungary, and the French in Piedmont. He suffered a grievous setback in the siege he laid to the city of Asti in 1526 where, after having breached the walls by cannon fire for a final assault, legend narrates that victory was snatched from his grasp by the intervention of the town's patron saint, St.Secondus of Asti who is said to have appeared in the sky. Fighting on the imperial side, he took part in the Sack of Rome the following year, and three years later, in the siege of Florence. He gained a reputation as a ruthless mercenary and ravager.

== Murder ==
The black name he earned in Italian history and popular memory came from the way he despatched Francesco Ferrucci, the captain of the Florentine army. Maramaldo fought for the Duke of Orange, for the restoration of the Medici, against the army of the Florentine Republic. The two forces clashed in the town of Gavinana on the 3rd of August 1530, and Maramaldo murdered his old enemy, who had been grievously wounded and taken prisoner, against the principles of chivalrous conduct in wartime. There are many differing accounts of the episode, the incident being much favoured in early historical accounts and fiction. Massimo d'Azeglio in his historical novel reimagined the scene, as recounted by the character Fanfulla, thus:-

'The Spaniard who had taken Ferruccio, wished to conceal him, but orders came from Maramaldo, to conduct him to his presence. Two pikes were crossed, he was seated upon them and carried to the square... They flung him down at Maramaldo's feet; he fell with great force, but, however, he raised himself on one arm, and maintained a front more lofty and daring than ever... Maramaldo approached him and said, 'You are here at last, poltroon merchant.' But Ferruccio, disarmed, and disabled, and helpless as he was, defied him to his face, and called him a liar, and while he was thus upbraiding the traitor, I saw Maramaldo feel for the handle of his dagger; he unsheathed it, and held it up in Ferruccio's face... Ferruccio moved not, he turned not... Twice the blade was plunged into his throat, and, dying, and the blood spouting from his mouth, he murmured, 'Vile poltroon, you murder a dead man'.'

== Maramaldo in the Italian language ==
The phrase, 'you are killing a dead man', in Italian, tu uccidi un uomo morto, became proverbial. However, there are notable differences in contemporary Renaissance accounts of Ferrucci's last words. The version here comes from the contemporary historian Benedetto Varchi's History of Florence. Paolo Giovio, in his Historiarum sui temporis libri XLV,(1550–1552) has Ferrucci saying, 'If you kill me, you will gain neither profit nor the approbation of praise from my murder'. A third minor contemporary source, given in the Tuscan dialect, has Ferrucci say, 'Tu darai a un morto'(You'll be bashing a corpse), which may be more probable. Ten days later, Florence surrendered, and was forced to accept the return of the Medici.

The feats of the Neapolitan condottiere, particularly this last incident, impressed themselves on the popular imagination, to the point that his name became synonymous with maltreatment of the weak or anyone incapable of defending himself, or for the type of person who shows himself ready to overcome or betray others as soon as he detects some weakness.

Thus, in the Italian language, the substantive maramaldo and the adjective maramaldesco ("Maramaldesque") has become eponymous of "ruthless", "villainous". One occasionally comes across the verb, maramaldeggiare in the sense of 'treat someone badly by ruthless mockery'
