= Johannes Schenck von Grafenberg =

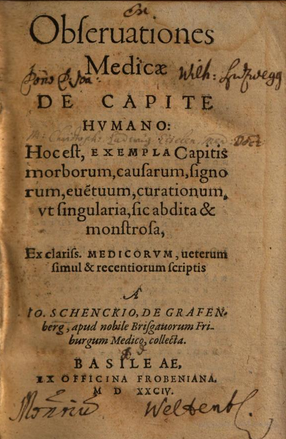
Observationes medicae, 1584

Johannes Schenck von Grafenberg (Latin: Ioannes Schenckius) (June 20, 1530 – November 12, 1598) was a German physician. He studied at Tübingen, and was later a physician to the city of Freiburg im Breisgau. He was the father of physician Johann-Georg Schenck von Grafenberg (died 1620).

Johannes Schenck was one of the more influential authorities on medicine during the late Renaissance Era. His studies of language disturbances caused by brain injuries are considered advanced by 16th-century standards, and because of this research he is considered to be a pioneer of neurolinguistics. In this field he published the 1584 treatise Observationes Medicæ de Capite Humano, in which he describes his personal observations of language disorders, along with the observations of other physicians.

Schenck's best-known written work was Observationum medicarum rariorum, libri VII, which was a seven-volume compendium that described pathological conditions concerning all the parts of the human body. Information in these books was derived from medical experiences described by Schenck and his contemporaries, and well as medical observations taken from sources dating back to antiquity.
