= Francesco Ferruccio =

Italian captain

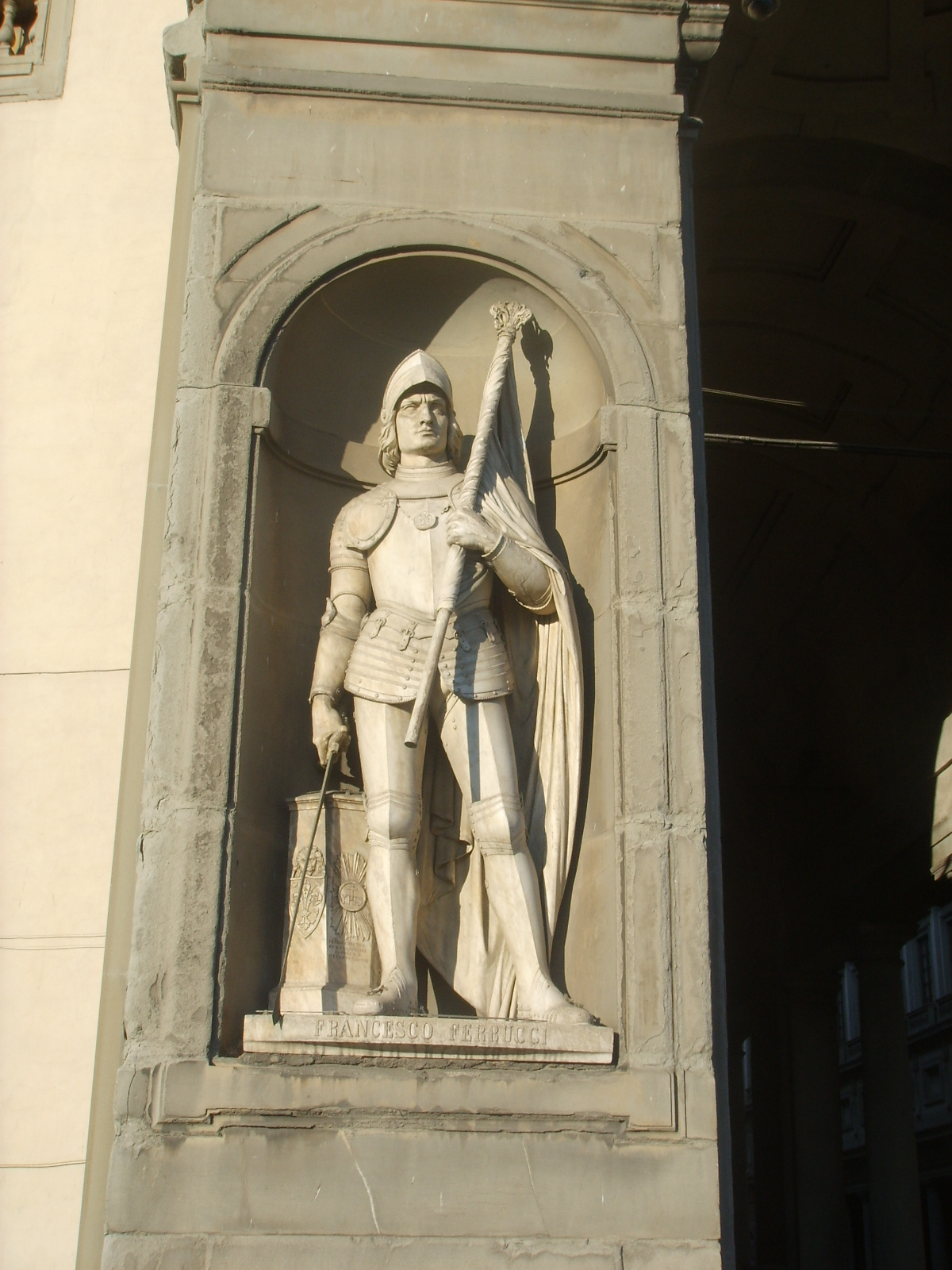
- Statue of Francesco Ferruccio at the Uffizi
- Native name: Francesco Ferrucci
- Born: August 14, 1489; Florence, Republic of Florence
- Died: August 3, 1530 (aged 40) Gavinana, Republic of Florence
- Cause of death: Executed by Fabrizio Maramaldo
- Allegiance: Florentine Republic
- Service years: 1527–1530
- Rank: Commissioner General
- Conflicts: Battle of Gavinana; Siege of Florence (1529–1530); War of the League of Cognac

Francesco Ferruccio (or Ferrucci) (1489 – 3 August 1530) was an Italian captain from Florence who fought in the Italian Wars.

== Biography ==
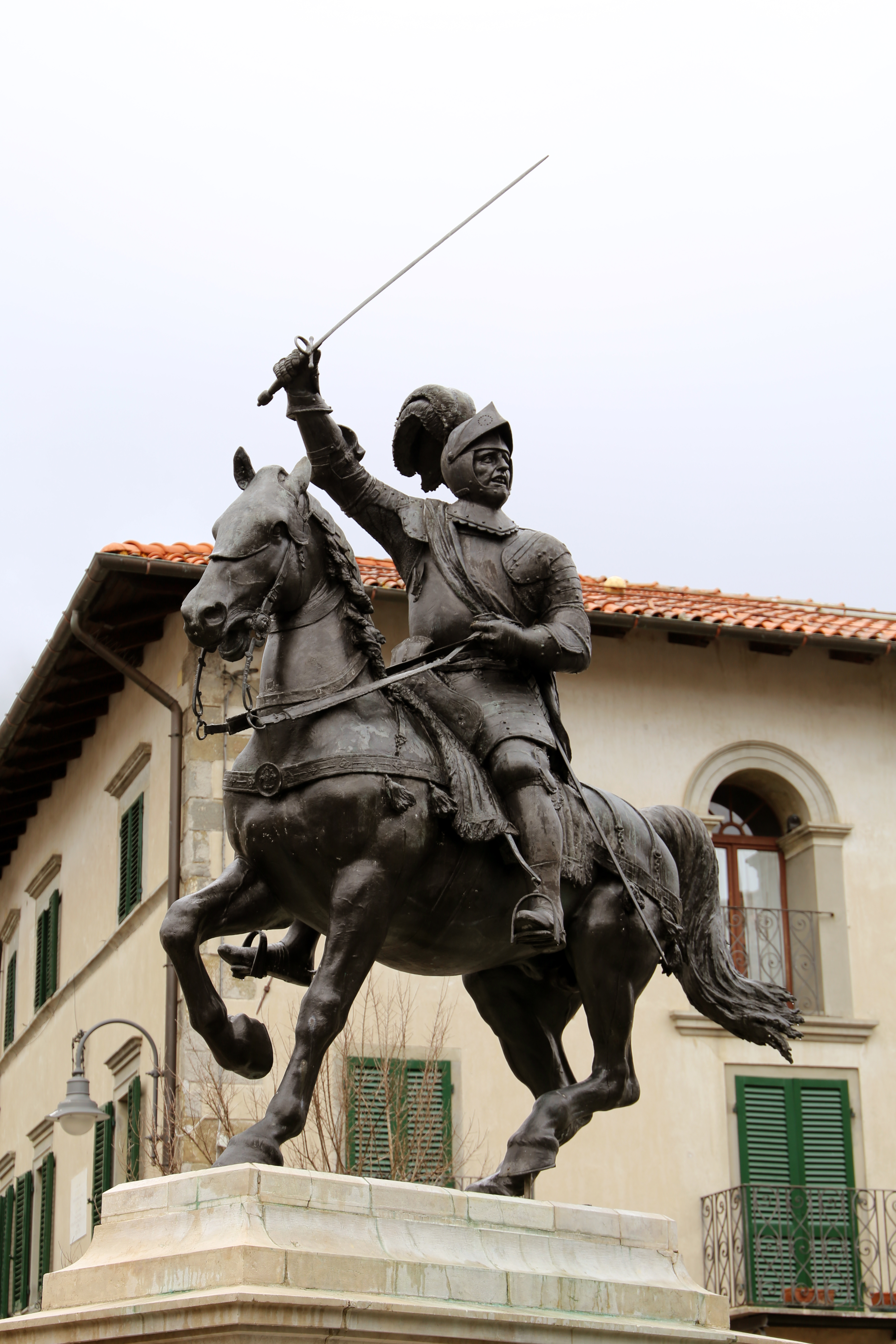
Equestrian monument (1920) to Ferruccio in Gavinana

After spending a few years as a merchant's clerk he took to soldiering at an early age, and served his apprenticeship under Giovanni de' Medici, in the latter's Black Bands (Delle Bande Nere being Giovanni de' Medici's nickname, from the black stripes on his insignia) in various parts of Italy, earning a reputation as a daring fighter and swashbuckler. When Pope Clement VII and the emperor Charles V decided to reinstate the Medici in Florence, during the War of the League of Cognac, they attacked the Florentine Republic, and Ferruccio was appointed Florentine military commissioner, where he showed great daring and resource by his rapid marches and sudden attacks on the Imperials.

Early in 1530 Volterra had thrown off Florentine allegiance and had been occupied by an Imperial garrison, but Ferruccio surprised and recaptured the city. During his absence, however, the Imperials captured Empoli by treachery, thus cutting off one of the chief avenues of approach to Florence. Ferruccio proposed to the government of the Republic that he should march on Rome and terrorize the Pope by the threat of a sack into making peace with Florence on favourable terms, but although the war committee appointed him commissioner-general for the operations outside the city, they rejected his scheme as too audacious.

Ferruccio then decided to attempt a diversion by attacking the Imperials in the rear and started from Volterra for the Apennines. But at Pisa he was laid up for a month with a fever, which enabled the enemy to get wind of his plan and to prepare for his attack. At the end of July Ferruccio left Pisa at the head of about 4,000 men. Although the besieged in Florence, knowing that a large part of the Imperialists under the Prince of Orange Philibert of Châlon, had gone to meet Ferruccio, wished to co-operate with the latter by means of a sortie, they were prevented from doing so by their own treacherous commander, Malatesta Baglioni.

Left alone, Ferruccio encountered a much larger force of the enemy on 3 August at Gavinana. In the desperate battle that ensued, the Imperials were at first driven back by Ferruccio's onslaught and the Prince of Orange himself was killed. But when 2,000 Landsknecht reinforcements under Fabrizio Maramaldo arrived, the Florentines were almost annihilated, and Ferruccio was wounded and captured. Maramaldo out of personal spite dispatched Ferruccio with his own hand: "Vile, tu uccidi un uomo morto!" ("Coward, you kill a dead man!") were, according to popular accounts, Ferruccio's last words uttered to his murderer. This defeat sealed the fate of the Republic, and nine days later Florence surrendered. Maramaldo's deed earned him immortal infamy, even turning his own surname into a synonym for "villainous" in Italian, while the verb maramaldeggiare exists as well-meaning "to bully a defenceless victim".

== Posthumous myth ==
During the Risorgimento, when the country of Italy was being assembled from parts occupied by foreign empires or dynasties, the figure of Ferruccio became a historical metaphor for the present struggles. L'Assedio di Firenze, the most famous novel of Francesco Domenico Guerrazzi, was based on and greatly glorified his life; he is indeed cited in "Il Canto degli Italiani", the national anthem of Italy composed in 1847 by Goffredo Mameli. In an 1849 speech at Livorno, Garibaldi likened himself to him: "I have touched with my sword the ashes of Ferruccio, and I will know how to die like Ferruccio."

Under Fascism, the legend of his life and death was much celebrated, and a festival in his name was set up in Florence to inculcate his life as an exemplary model. That partially accounts for the popularity of naming male children in Tuscany born at that period 'Ferruccio'.

== See also ==
- Asteroid 82927 Ferrucci was named in his honor
- Condottieri
- Italian Wars
- War of the League of Cognac
