= Antonio de Leyva, Duke of Terranova =

15th/16th-century Spanish military officer

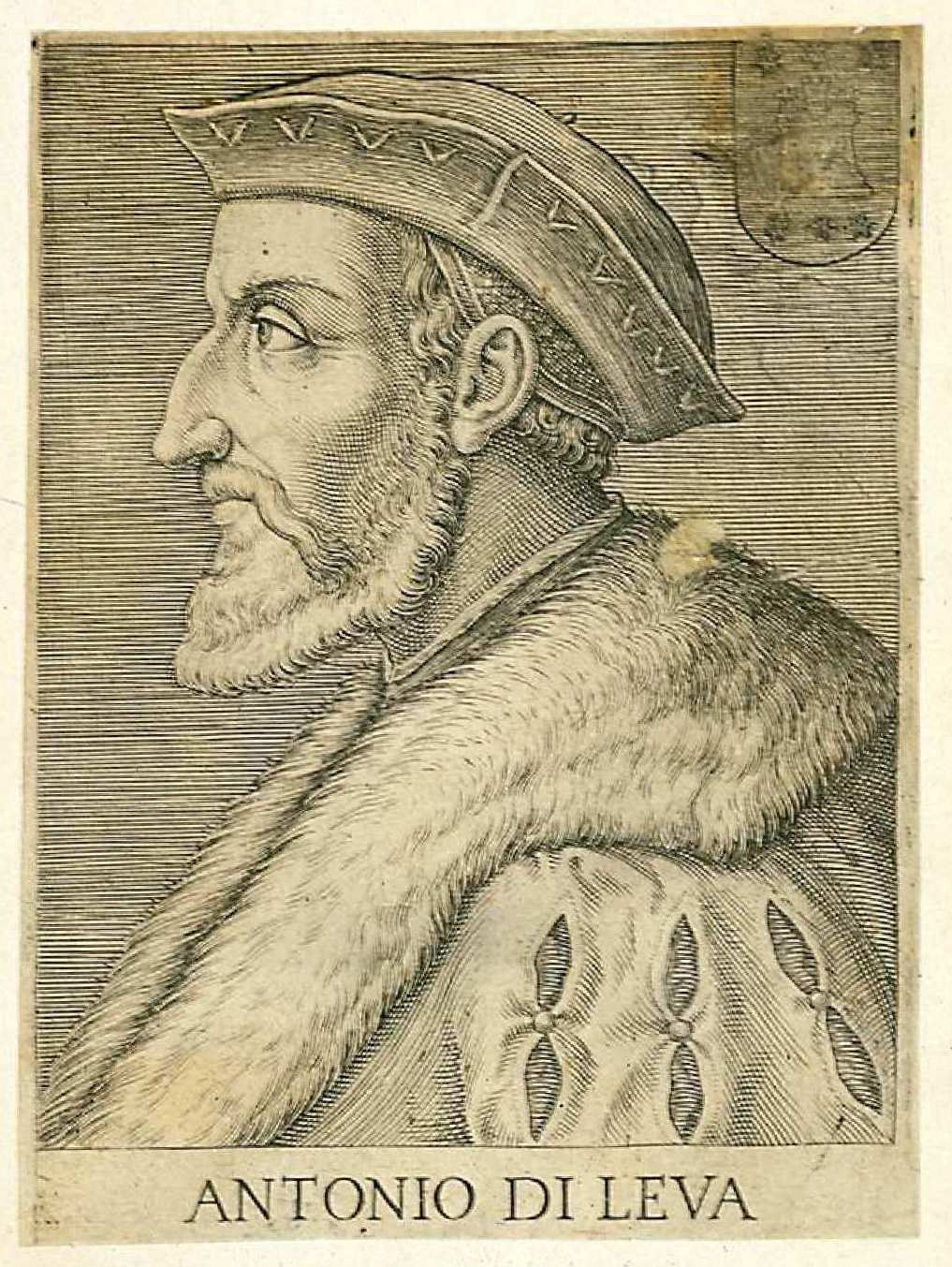
Antonio de Leyva, 1596

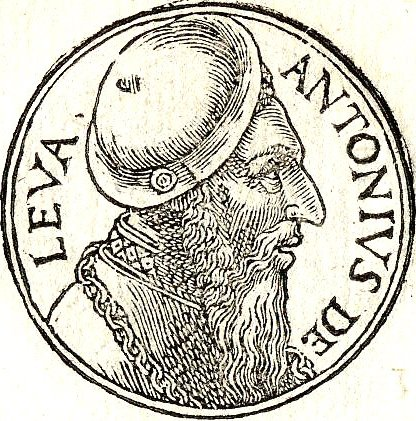
From Promptuarii Iconum Insigniorum

Antonio de Leyva, Prince of Ascoli, Count of Monza (1480–1536) was a Spanish general during the Italian Wars. During the Italian War of 1521, he commanded Pavia during the siege of the city by Francis I of France, and took part in the Battle of Pavia in 1525. After the death of Fernando d'Ávalos, Marquis of Pescara, he held further commands in Italy during the War of the League of Cognac and finally died shortly after attempting an invasion of Provence.

== Biography ==
Belonging to a family from Navarre, Antonio de Leyva made his military debut in the Alpujarras (1502) during the struggle against the revolting Mudéjares from Granada and later served in Italy under the Gran Capitán (1503–1504). He had a prominent part in the Italian Wars and was wounded at the Battle of Ravenna in 1512. Later on, under the Marquis of Pescara, he fought near Milan and in the unlucky campaign of Provence in 1524, in which they succeeded in looting the countryside but were forced to withdraw without having managed to conquer Marseille.

After this failure he had the post of commander of the garrison of Pavia and here sustained the long siege from the French army led by King Francis I (October 1524 – February 1525) which gave time to the Spanish and Imperial forces to reorganize and to win the famous Battle of Pavia.

In 1525 he succeeded to the Marquis of Pescara as commander-in-chief of the Imperial army in the Duchy of Milan. When the last Sforza Duke of Milan Francesco II died in 1535, he was appointed Governor of Milan by Emperor Charles V. During a review in honor of de Leyva, Charles V appeared dressed as a common pikeman and asked to be recorded in the rolls of the Tercio as "Carlos de Gante, soldier of the gallant Tercio of Antonio de Leyva".

Antonio de Leyva died of gout during the campaign of Provence in 1536 but was buried in Milan in the now-destroyed church of San Dionigi. His descendants lived in Milan where they became one of the city's most prominent families. One of his descendants was the infamous Nun of Monza.

Political offices
Preceded by none	Governors of the Duchy of Milan; 1535–1536	Succeeded by Cardinal Marino Caracciolo
