= Battle of Gavinana =

Final battle of the War of the League of Cognac

- Part of the War of the League of Cognac
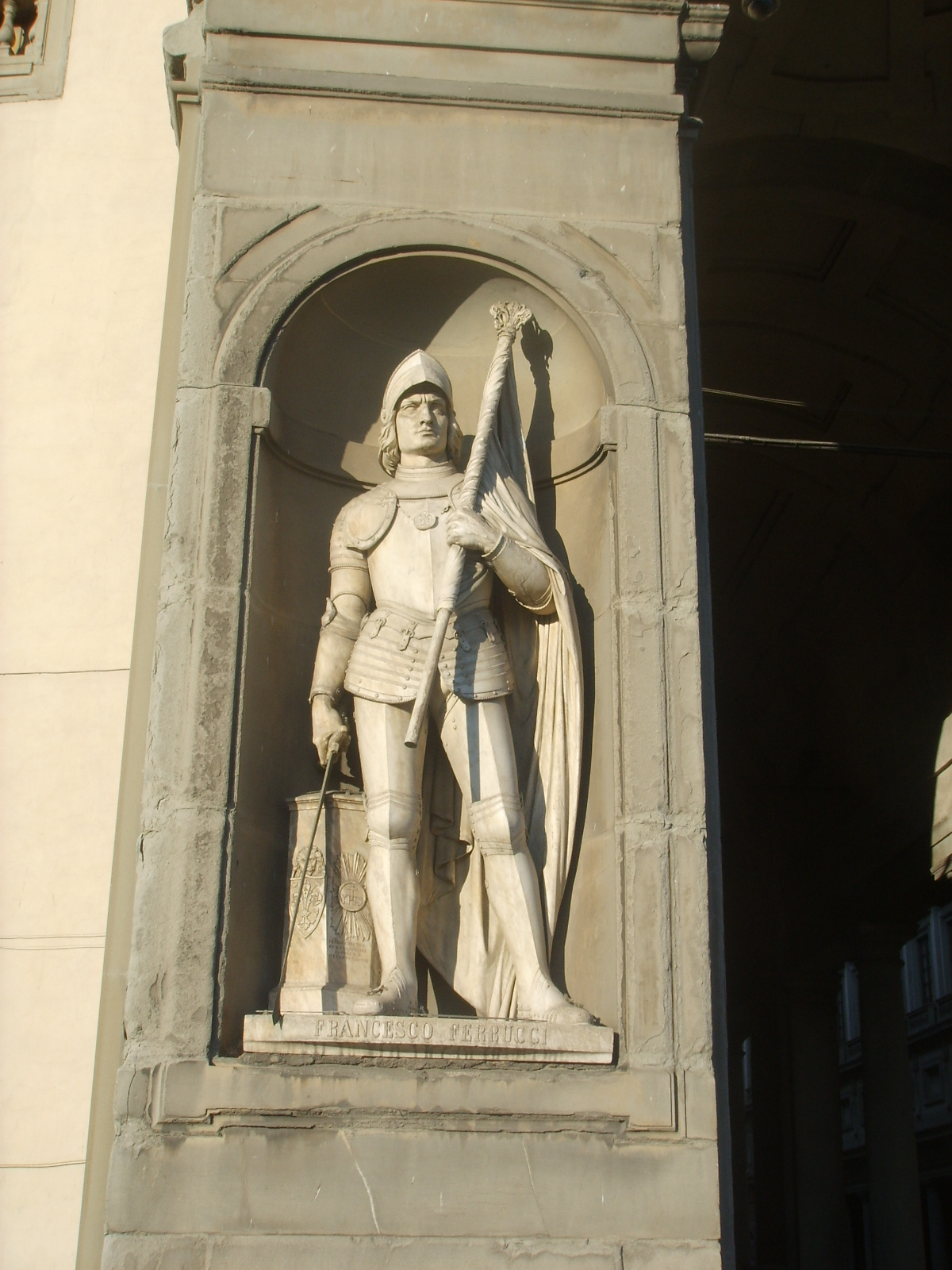
- Statues in the Uffizi outside Gallery. Famous florentine, Francesco Ferruccio.
| Date | 3 August 1530 |
| Location | Gavinana, near Florence, Italy 43°56′00″N 10°55′00″E |
| Result | Imperial victory |

Belligerents
| Holy Roman Empire | Florence |

Commanders and leaders
| Philibert of Châlon †, Fabrizio Maramaldo | Francesco Ferruccio † |

Strength
| 5,000–7,000 infantry 2,000 cavalry | 3,000–3,500 infantry |
- Location within Italy

The Battle of Gavinana took place during the War of the League of Cognac. It was fought on 3 August 1530 between the city of Florence and the army of the Holy Roman Empire.

== History ==
The Imperial forces were led by Philibert of Châlon, Prince of Orange, with reinforcements under Fabrizio Maramaldo arriving later in the battle. The Florentine forces were led by the Florentine commissary Francesco Ferruccio.

At first the Florentines drove back the Imperial army, despite being outnumbered. In the process, the Prince of Orange was fatally shot in the chest by two arquebus balls.

However, when Maramaldo arrived with 2,000 troops the tide was reversed. After being wounded and captured, Ferruccio was executed personally by Maramaldo. Ferruccio's last response to his murderer, tu uccidi un uomo morto (you are killing a dead man) led him to long lasting fame and to become one of the major icons of the Italian risorgimento. In contrast, Maramaldo's behavior, echoed by several historical reports, gave his name a shameful reputation, and in modern Italian maramaldo means cowardly murderer.
