= Italian Wars =

European conflicts from 1494 to 1559

- Part of the French–Habsburg rivalry, the Spanish–Ottoman wars, the Ottoman–Habsburg wars, and the Anglo-French wars
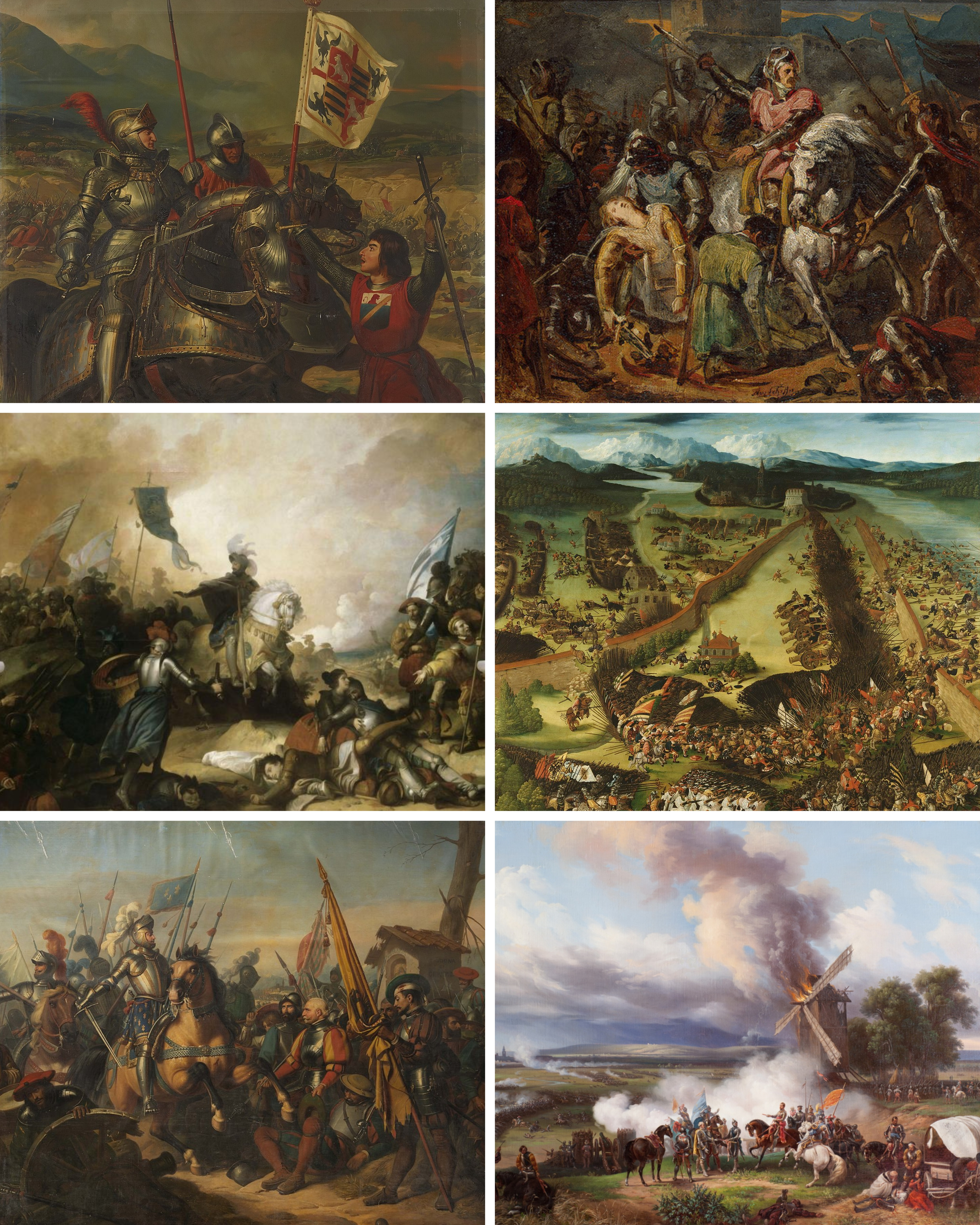
- Left to right, top to bottom: Battle of Fornovo, 1495; Battle of Ravenna, 1512; Battle of Marignano, 1515; Battle of Pavia, 1525; Battle of Ceresole, 1544; Battle of St. Quentin, 1557
Date	1494–1498; 1499–1501; 1502–1504; 1508–1516; 1521–1526; 1526–1530; 1536–1538; 1542–1546; 1551–1559
Location	Primarily Italian Peninsula, also County of Flanders, the Rhineland, France, Spain and the Mediterranean Sea
Result	Peace of Cateau-Cambrésis: Spanish–Imperial victory; French defeat in Italy, with gains in other theatres; Mixed results among the Italian states; English defeat
Territorial changes	Spanish Empire sovereign over the Kingdom of Naples, the Duchy of Milan and the Presidi in Tuscany.; Lorraine cedes Three Bishoprics to France; France gains Calais from England; Independent Savoyard state re-established; Florence annexes Siena

Belligerents
France; Romagna (1501–1503); England (1526–1528); Ottoman Empire (1536–1559)	Spanish Empire: Spain; Sardinia; Sicily; Naples (1504–1559); Milan (1554–1559); Spanish Netherlands (1556–1559); Presidi (1557–1559); Holy Roman Empire; (Holy Roman Empire) Habsburg Austria; Naples (1494–1501); England (1496–1526; 1542–1559)	Venice; Milan; Florence; Pisa; Papal States; Ferrara; Genoa (Note: With the exception of Sardinia, Naples and Sicily, which generally were under the Spanish Monarchy, many Italian states switched sides on a regular basis)

Commanders and leaders
(Kingdom of France) Charles VIII; (Kingdom of France) Louis XII; (Kingdom of France) Francis I; (Kingdom of France) Henry II; (Kingdom of France) Chabot; (Kingdom of France) Nemours †; Cesare Borgia; Suleiman I; Hayreddin Barbarossa; (Duchy of Milan) Trivulzio	(Spanish Empire) Ferdinand V; (Spanish Empire) Isabella I; (Holy Roman Empire) (Spanish Empire) Charles V; (Spanish Empire) Philip II; (Spanish Empire) Gran Capitán; (Holy Roman Empire) Maximilian I; (Holy Roman Empire) Ferdinand I; (Kingdom of England) Henry VIII; (Kingdom of England) Mary I; (Kingdom of Naples) Alfonso II; (Kingdom of Naples) Frederick	(Republic of Venice) Francesco Maria I; (Republic of Venice) Andrea Gritti; (Republic of Florence) Cosimo I de' Medici; (Duchy of Milan) Ludovico Sforza; (Duchy of Milan) Massimiliano Sforza; (Duchy of Milan) Francesco II Sforza; (Papal States) Alexander VI; (Papal States) Pius III; (Papal States) Julius II; (Papal States) Leo X; (Papal States) Adrian VI; (Papal States) Clement VII; (Papal States) Paul III; (Papal States) Julius III; (Papal States) Marcellus II; (Papal States) Paul IV

The Italian Wars (Note: Also known as the Habsburg–Valois Wars) were a series of conflicts fought between 1494 and 1559 in the Italian Peninsula, with subsidiary theatres in Flanders, the Rhineland and Mediterranean Sea. Related to the long-running French–Habsburg rivalry, its primary belligerents were France versus Spain and the Holy Roman Empire, supported by numerous Italian states at different stages, (Note: They included Venice, Milan, Naples, Sicily, Florence, Siena, the Papal States, Ferrara, and Genoa) along with England, and the Ottoman Empire.

The collapse of the Italic League in 1492 allowed Charles VIII of France to invade Naples in 1494, which drew in Spain and the Holy Roman Empire. Although he was forced to withdraw in 1495, ongoing political divisions among the Italian states made them a battleground in the struggle for European domination between France and the Habsburgs.

After 1503, most of the fighting was initiated by French invasions of Lombardy and Piedmont, but although able to hold territory for periods of time, they could not do so permanently. By 1557, the growth of Protestantism meant the major belligerents faced internal conflict over religion, forcing them to refocus on domestic affairs. This led to the Treaty of Cateau-Cambrésis, under which France was largely expelled from Italy, but in exchange gained Calais from England, and the Three Bishoprics from Lorraine. In turn, Spain acquired sovereignty over the Kingdom of Naples and Kingdom of Sicily in southern Italy, as well the Duchy of Milan in northern Italy.

Fought with considerable brutality, the wars took place against the background of religious turmoil caused by the Reformation, particularly in France and the Holy Roman Empire. They are seen as a turning point in the evolution from medieval to modern warfare, with the use of the arquebus or handgun becoming common, along with significant technological improvements in siege artillery. Literate commanders and modern printing methods also make them one of the first conflicts with a significant number of contemporary accounts, including those of Francesco Guicciardini, Niccolò Machiavelli, and Blaise de Montluc.

== Background ==
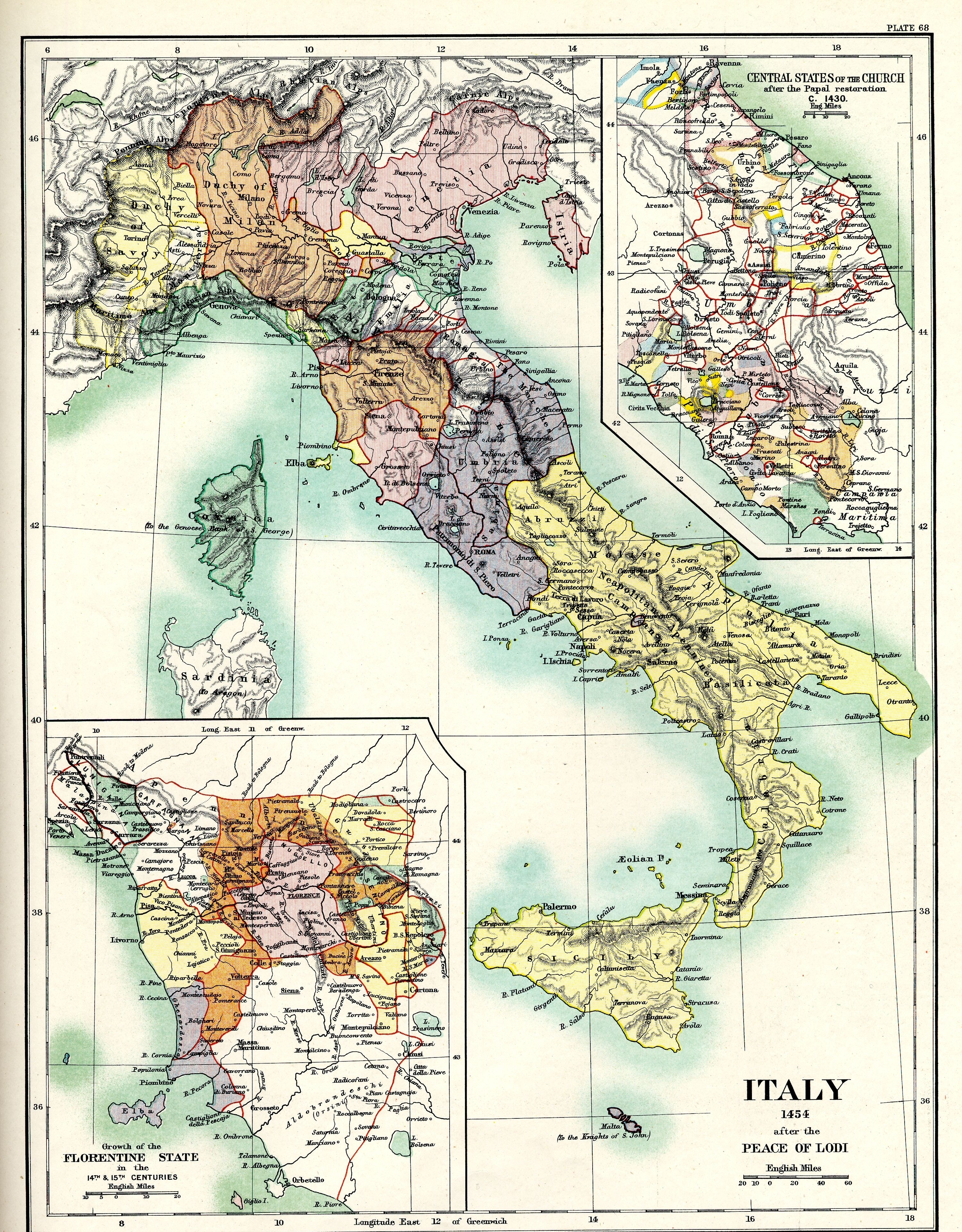
Italy after the 1454 Peace of Lodi

Largely driven by the rivalry between the Republic of Venice and the Duchy of Milan, the long-running Wars in Lombardy had finally been ended by the 1454 Treaty of Lodi. Followed shortly thereafter by a non-aggression pact known as the Italic League, it led to a forty-year period of stability and economic expansion, marred only by the 1479 to 1481 Pazzi conspiracy and 1482 to 1484 War of Ferrara. The League's main supporter was the Florentine ruler Lorenzo de' Medici, who also pursued a policy of excluding France and the Holy Roman Empire from the Italian peninsula.

Lorenzo's death in April 1492 severely weakened the League at a time when France was seeking to expand in Italy. This originated when Louis XI of France inherited the County of Provence from his cousin Charles IV of Anjou in 1481, along with the Angevin claim to the Kingdom of Naples. His son Charles VIII succeeded him in 1483 and formally incorporated Provence into France in 1486; its ports of Marseille and Toulon provided direct access to the Mediterranean and thus the ability to pursue his territorial ambitions.

In the run-up to the First Italian War, Charles sought to secure the neutrality of other European rulers through a series of treaties. These included the November 1492 Peace of Étaples with Henry VII of England and the March 1493 Treaty of Barcelona with Ferdinand II of Aragon.

== History ==
=== Italian War of 1494–1495 ===
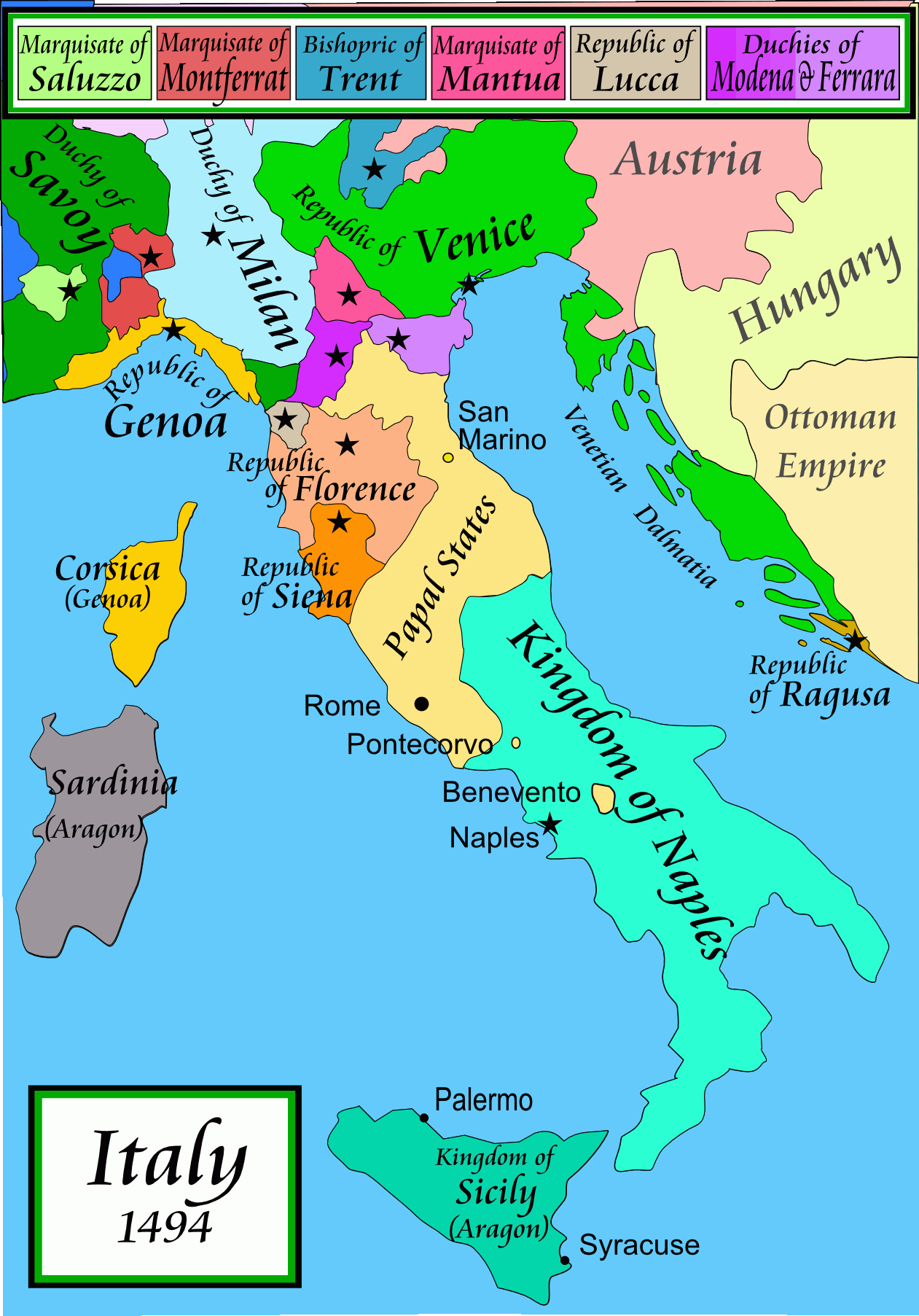
Italy in 1494

The war began when Ludovico Sforza, then Regent of Milan, encouraged Charles VIII of France to invade Italy, using the Angevin claim to the throne of Naples as a pretext. This in turn was driven by the intense rivalry between Ludovico's wife, Beatrice d'Este, and that of his nephew Gian Galeazzo Sforza, husband of Isabella of Aragon. Despite being the hereditary Duke of Milan, Gian Galeazzo had been sidelined by his uncle in 1481 and exiled to Pavia. Both women wanted to ensure their children inherited the duchy and when Isabella's father became Alfonso II of Naples in January 1494, she asked for his help in securing their rights. In September Charles invaded the peninsula, which he justified by claiming he wanted to use Naples as a base for a crusade against the Ottoman Turks.

In October, Ludovico formally became duke of Milan following the death of Gian Galeazzo, who was popularly supposed to have been poisoned by his uncle, (Note: This is disputed; lack of medical knowledge meant deaths from unknown disease were often ascribed to poison, while Gian Galeazzo had shown symptoms of what may have been stomach cancer since the age of 13) and the French marched through Italy virtually unopposed, entering Pisa on 8 November, Florence on 17th, and Rome on 31 December. Charles was backed by Girolamo Savonarola, who used the opportunity to establish a short-lived theocracy in Florence, while Pope Alexander VI allowed his army free passage through the Papal States.

In February 1495, the French reached Monte San Giovanni Campano in the Kingdom of Naples and despatched envoys to negotiate terms with its Neapolitan garrison, who murdered them and sent their mutilated bodies back to the French lines. On 9 February, the enraged besiegers breached the walls of the castle with artillery fire, then stormed it, killing everyone inside. Known as the "Sack of Naples", widespread outrage within Italy allied with concern over the power of France led to the formation of the League of Venice on 31 March 1495, an anti-French alliance composed of Republic of Venice, Milan, Spain, and the Holy Roman Empire.

Later joined by Florence, following the overthrow of Savonarola, the Papal States and Mantua, this coalition cut off Charles and his army from their bases in France. Charles' cousin, Louis d'Orléans, now tried to take advantage of Ludovico's change of sides to conquer Milan, which he claimed through his grandmother, Valentina Visconti. On 11 June, he captured Novara when the garrison defected, and reached Vigevano, forty kilometres from Milan. At this crucial point, Ludovico was incapacitated either by a stroke or nervous breakdown, while his unpaid soldiers were on the verge of mutiny. In his absence, his wife Beatrice d'Este took personal control of the duchy and the siege of Novara, with Louis eventually forced to surrender in return for his freedom.

Having replaced Ferdinand II of Naples with a pro-French government, Charles turned north and on 6 July was intercepted by the League outside Fornovo di Taro. In the resulting Battle of Fornovo, the French forced their opponents back across the Taro river and continued onto Asti, leaving most of their supplies behind. Both sides claimed victory but the general consensus favoured the French, since the League suffered heavier casualties and failed to halt their retreat, the reason for fighting in the first place. (Note: But the victory was universally adjudged to the French on account of the great Disproportion of the slain, of their driving the Enemy on the other side of the River, and because their Passage was no longer obstructed, which was all they contended for, the Battle being fought on no other Account) In the south, despite some initial reverses, by September 1495 Ferdinand II had regained control of his kingdom. Although the French invasion achieved little, it showed the Italian states were rich and comparatively weak, making future intervention attractive to outside powers. Charles himself died on 7 April 1498, and was succeeded by the former Duke of Orléans, who became Louis XII.

=== Italian Wars of 1499–1504 ===
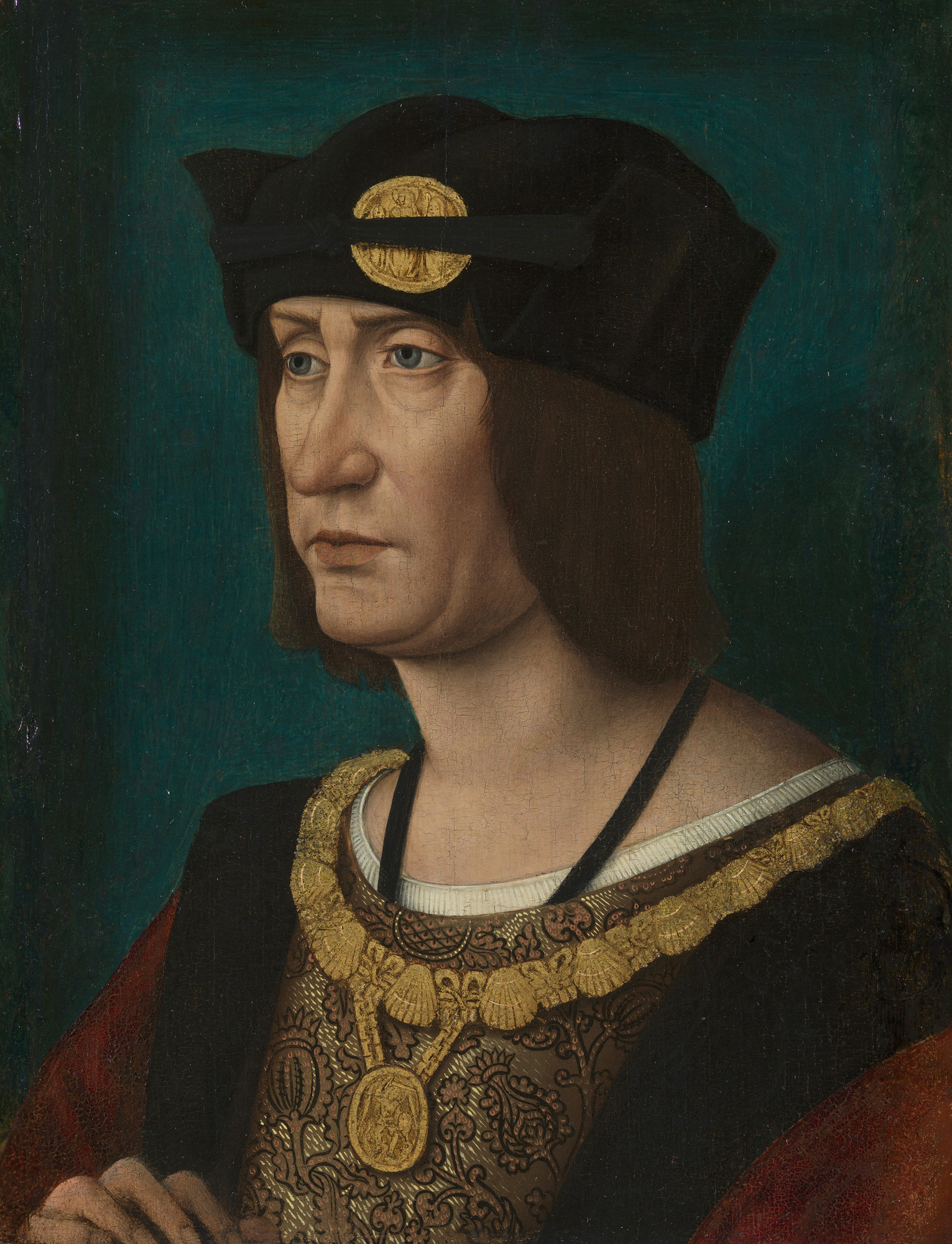
Louis XII

The next phase of the conflict originated in the long-standing rivalry between Florence and the Republic of Pisa, which had been annexed by Florence in 1406 but took advantage of the French invasion to regain its independence in 1494. Despite Charles' retreat in 1495, Pisa continued to receive support from Genoa, Venice and Milan, all of whom were suspicious of Florentine power. In order to strengthen his own position, Ludovico once again invited an external power to settle an internal Italian affair, in this case Emperor Maximilian I. In doing so, Maximilian hoped to bolster the League of Venice, which he viewed as an essential barrier to French intervention, but Florence was convinced he favoured Pisa and refused to accept mediation. To enforce a settlement, in July 1496 Maximilian besieged the Florentine city of Livorno, but withdrew in September due to shortages of men and supplies.

Following the death of Charles VIII in April 1498, Louis XII began planning another attempt on Milan, while also pursuing his predecessor's claim to the Kingdom of Naples. Aware of the hostility caused by French ambitions in Italy, in July 1498 he renewed the 1492 Peace of Étaples with England and signed a treaty confirming French borders with the Habsburg Netherlands. This was followed in August by the Treaty of Marcoussis with Ferdinand II of Aragon; although it did not address outstanding territorial disputes between the two countries, it agreed to "have all enemies in common except the Pope." On 9 February 1499, Louis signed the Treaty of Blois, a military alliance with Venice against Ludovico.

With these agreements finalised, a French army of 27,000 under the Milanese exile Gian Giacomo Trivulzio invaded Lombardy, and in August besieged Rocca d'Arazzo, a fortified town in the western part of the Duchy of Milan. The French siege artillery breached the walls in less than five hours and after the town capitulated, Louis ordered the execution of its garrison and senior members of the civil administration. Other Milanese strongholds surrendered rather than face the same fate, while Ludovico, whose wife Beatrice had died in 1497, fled the duchy with his children and took refuge with Maximilian. On 6 October 1499, Louis made a triumphant entry into Milan.

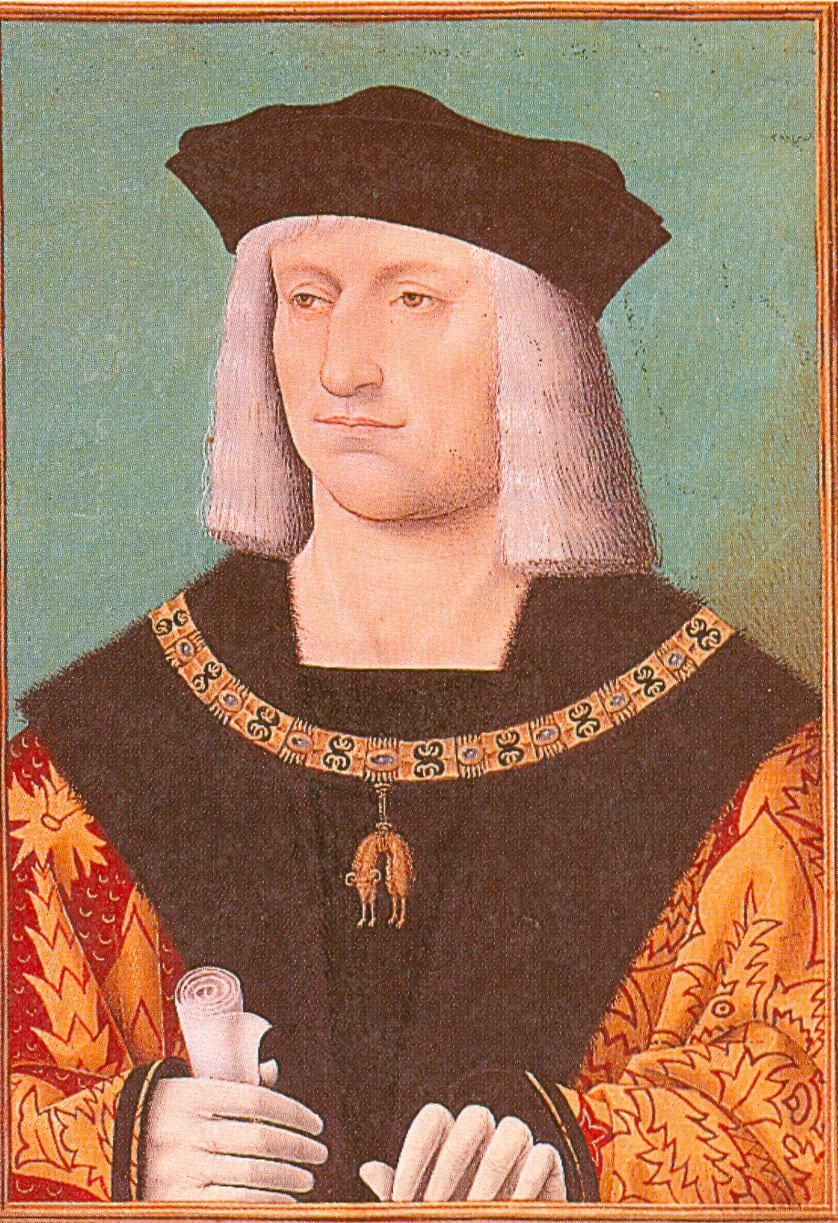
Emperor Maximilian, c. 1508

Florence now asked for French assistance in retaking Pisa, a request Louis was in no hurry to fulfill since they had refused to support his capture of Milan. He was also initially occupied in defeating efforts to regain his duchy by Ludovico, who was captured at Novaro in April 1500 and spent the rest of his life in a French prison. However, Louis needed to maintain good relations with Florence, whose territory he would have to cross in order to conquer Naples, and on 29 June 1500 a combined Franco-Florentine army appeared outside Pisa. Once again, the French artillery quickly opened a gap in the walls but several assaults were repulsed and the siege was abandoned on 11 July.

With Milan firmly in his control, Louis returned to France and left the Florentines to blockade Pisa, which eventually surrendered in 1509. Anxious to begin the conquest of Naples, on 11 November he signed the Treaty of Granada with Ferdinand II of Aragon, an agreement to divide the kingdom between the two. Since Ferdinand had supported the expulsion of the French from Naples in 1495, Louis hoped these concessions would allow him to acquire the bulk of the kingdom without an expensive war. His action was criticised by contemporaries like Niccolò Machiavelli and modern historians, who argue the 1499 Treaty of Marcoussis already gave Louis everything he needed, while inviting Spain into Naples could only work to his detriment.

In July 1501, the French army reached Capua; strongly defended by forces loyal to Frederick of Naples, it surrendered on 24 July after a short siege but was then sacked. In addition to the extensive material destruction, many women were subjected to mass rape and estimates of the dead ranged from 2,000 to 4,000, actions that caused consternation throughout Italy. Resistance crumbled as other towns tried to avoid the same fate and on 12 October Louis appointed Louis d'Armagnac, Duke of Nemours his viceroy in Naples. However, the Treaty of Granada had left the ownership of key Neapolitan territories undecided and disputes over these quickly poisoned relationships between the two powers. This led to war in late 1502, which ended with the French being expelled from Naples once again after defeats at Cerignola on 28 April 1503, and Garigliano on 29 December.

=== War of the League of Cambrai ===
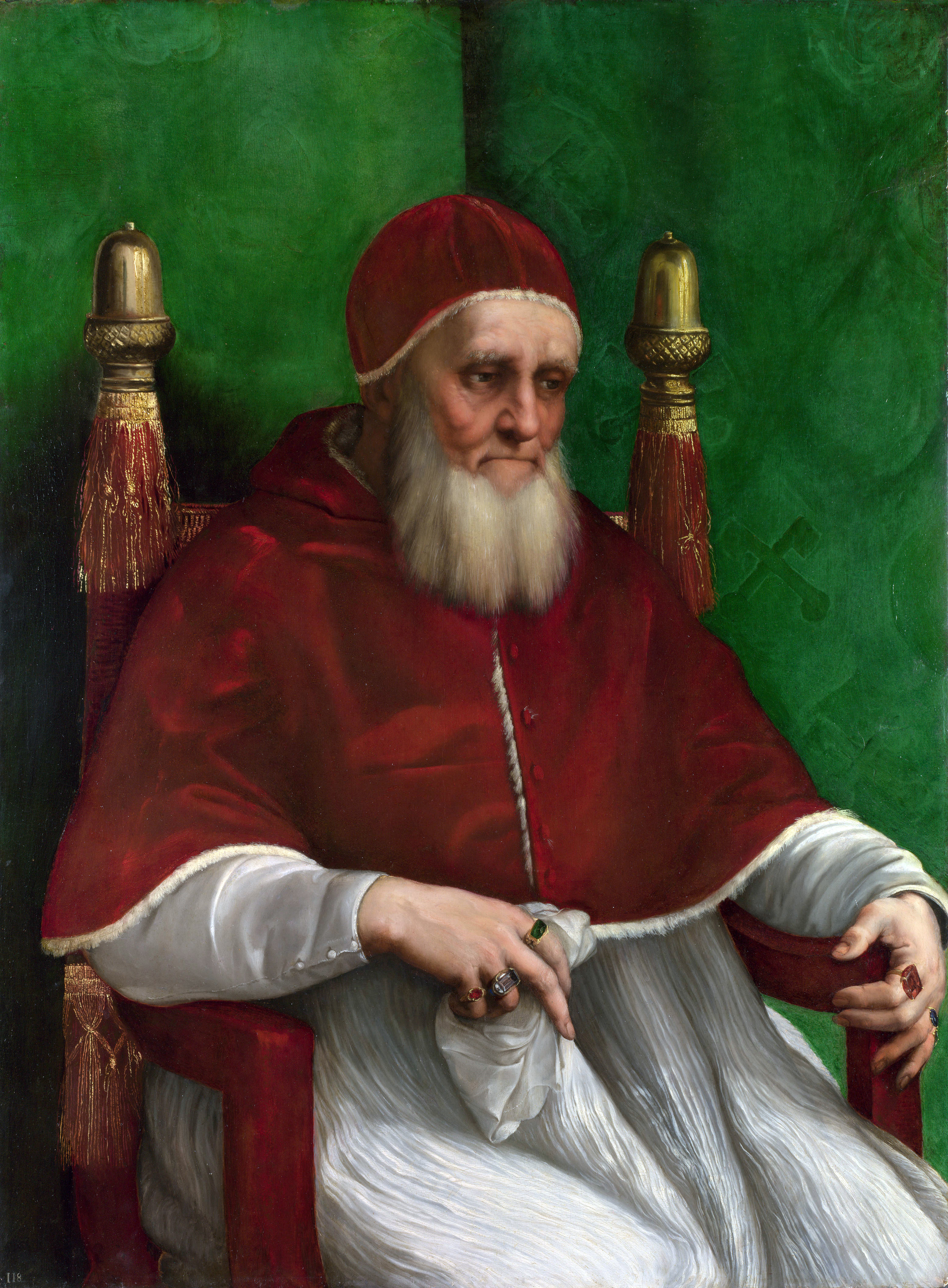
Pope Julius II, architect of the League of Cambrai

On 18 October 1503, Pius III was replaced by Pope Julius II, who as ruler of the Papal States was concerned by Venetian power in northern Italy. This fear was shared by his home town of Genoa, which also resented its expulsion from the Po Valley, and Maximilian, whose acquisition of Gorizia in 1500 was threatened by Venetian possession of neighbouring Friuli. Milan, controlled by Louis XII, was a long-standing opponent of Venice, while Ferdinand II, now king of Naples, wished to regain control of Venetian ports on the southern Adriatic coast. Along with the Duchy of Ferrara, Julius united these disparate interests into the anti-Venetian League of Cambrai, (Note: Ostensibly created by Pope Julius to resist Ottoman expansion and thus formally known as the "Holy League") signed on 10 December 1508.

Although the French largely destroyed a Venetian army at Agnadello on 14 May 1509, Maximilian failed to capture Padua and withdrew from Italy. Now seeing the power of Louis XII as the greater threat, in February 1510 Pope Julius made peace with Venice, followed in March by an agreement with the Swiss Cantons to supply him with 6,000 mercenaries. After a year of fighting in which Louis XII occupied large parts of the Papal States, in October 1511 Julius formed the anti-French Holy League, which included Henry VIII of England, Maximilian and Spain.

A French army defeated the Spanish at Ravenna on 11 April 1512, but their leader Gaston de Foix was killed, while the Swiss recaptured Milan and restored Ludovico's son Massimiliano Sforza as duke. The members of the League then fell out over dividing the spoils and the death of Pope Julius on 20 February 1513 left it without effective leadership. In March, Venice and France formed an alliance, but from June to September 1513 the League won victories at Novara and La Motta in Lombardy, Guinegate in Flanders and Flodden in England. Despite this, fighting continued in Italy, with neither side able to gain a decisive advantage.

On 1 January 1515, Louis XII died and was succeeded by his son-in-law, Francis I, who took up his predecessor's cause and routed the Swiss at Marignano on 13–14 September 1515. Combined with the unpopularity of Maximilian Sforza, victory allowed Francis to retake Milan and the Holy League collapsed as both Spain and Pope Leo X saw little benefit in fighting on. In the treaty of Noyon, signed on 13 August 1516, Charles I of Spain acknowledged Francis as duke of Milan, while Francis "passed" his claim to Naples onto Charles. Left isolated, in December Maximilian signed the Treaty of Brussels, which confirmed French possession of Milan.

=== Italian War of 1521–1526 ===
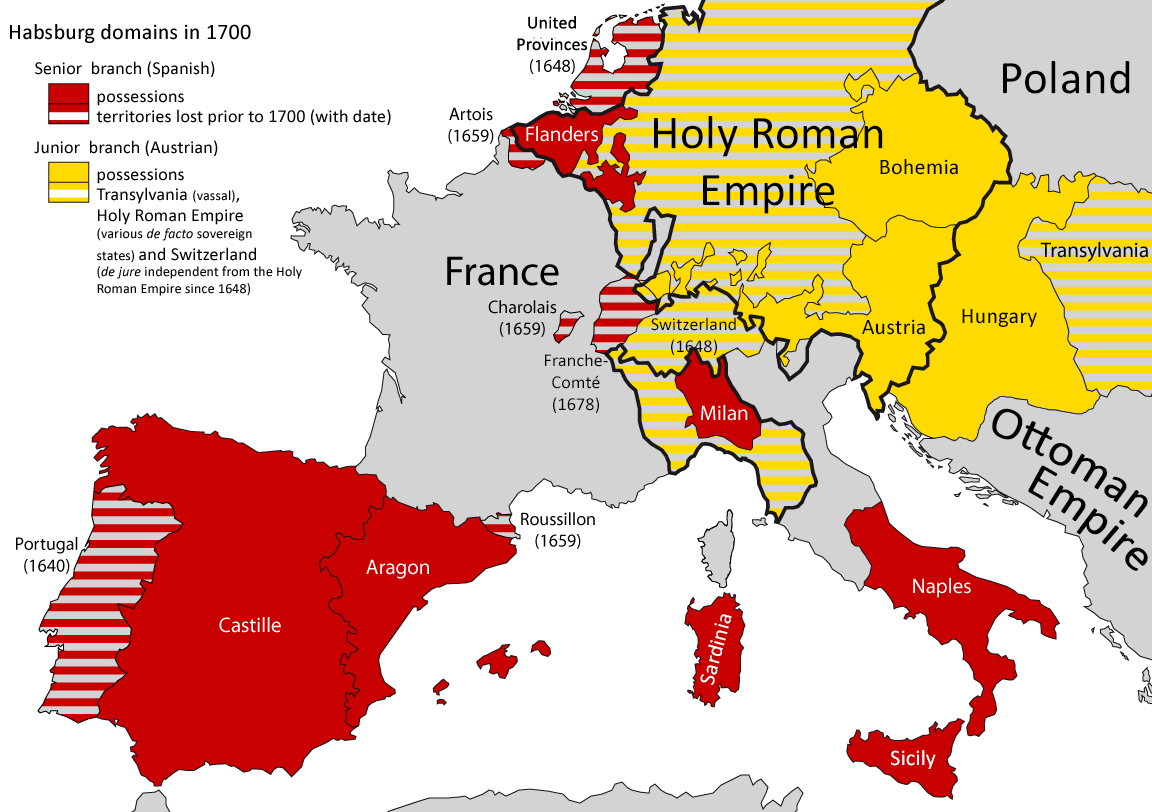
The election of Emperor Charles V meant France was surrounded by Habsburg territories on three sides (red=Spain; yellow=Austria).

Following the death of Maximilian in January 1519, the German princes elected Charles I of Spain as Emperor Charles V on 28 June. This brought Spain, the Low Countries and the Holy Roman Empire under one ruler, and meant France was surrounded by the so-called "Habsburg ring". Francis I had also been a candidate for the Imperial throne, adding a personal dimension to his rivalry with Charles that became one of the fundamental conflicts of the sixteenth century.

Planning an offensive against Habsburg possessions in Navarre and Flanders, Francis first secured his position in Italy by agreeing a new alliance with Venice. As Pope Leo X had backed his candidacy for emperor, he also counted on Papal support but Leo sided with Charles in return for his help against Martin Luther and his proposed reforms to the Catholic church. In November 1521, an Imperial-Papal army under Prospero Colonna and the Marquis of Pescara captured Milan and restored Francesco II Sforza as duke. After Leo died in December, Adrian VI was elected Pope on 9 January 1522, while a French attempt to retake Milan was ended by defeat at Bicocca on 27 April.

In May 1522, England joined the Imperial alliance and declared war on France. Venice left the war in July 1523, while Adrian died in November and was succeeded by Clement VII, who tried to negotiate an end to the fighting without success. Although France had lost ground in Lombardy and been invaded by English, Imperial and Spanish armies, her opponents had differing objectives and failed to co-ordinate their attacks. Since Papal policy was to prevent either France or the Empire from becoming too powerful, in late 1524 Clement secretly allied himself with Francis, enabling him to mount another offensive against Milan. On 24 February 1525, the French army suffered a devastating defeat at Pavia, in which Francis was captured and imprisoned in Spain.

This led to frantic diplomatic manoeuvres to secure his release, including a French mission to Suleiman the Magnificent, asking for Ottoman assistance. Although Suleiman avoided involvement on this occasion, it was the beginning of a long-standing, if often unacknowledged, Franco-Ottoman alliance. Francis was eventually released in March 1526 after signing the Treaty of Madrid, in which he renounced French claims to the County of Artois, Milan and Burgundy.

=== War of the League of Cognac ===
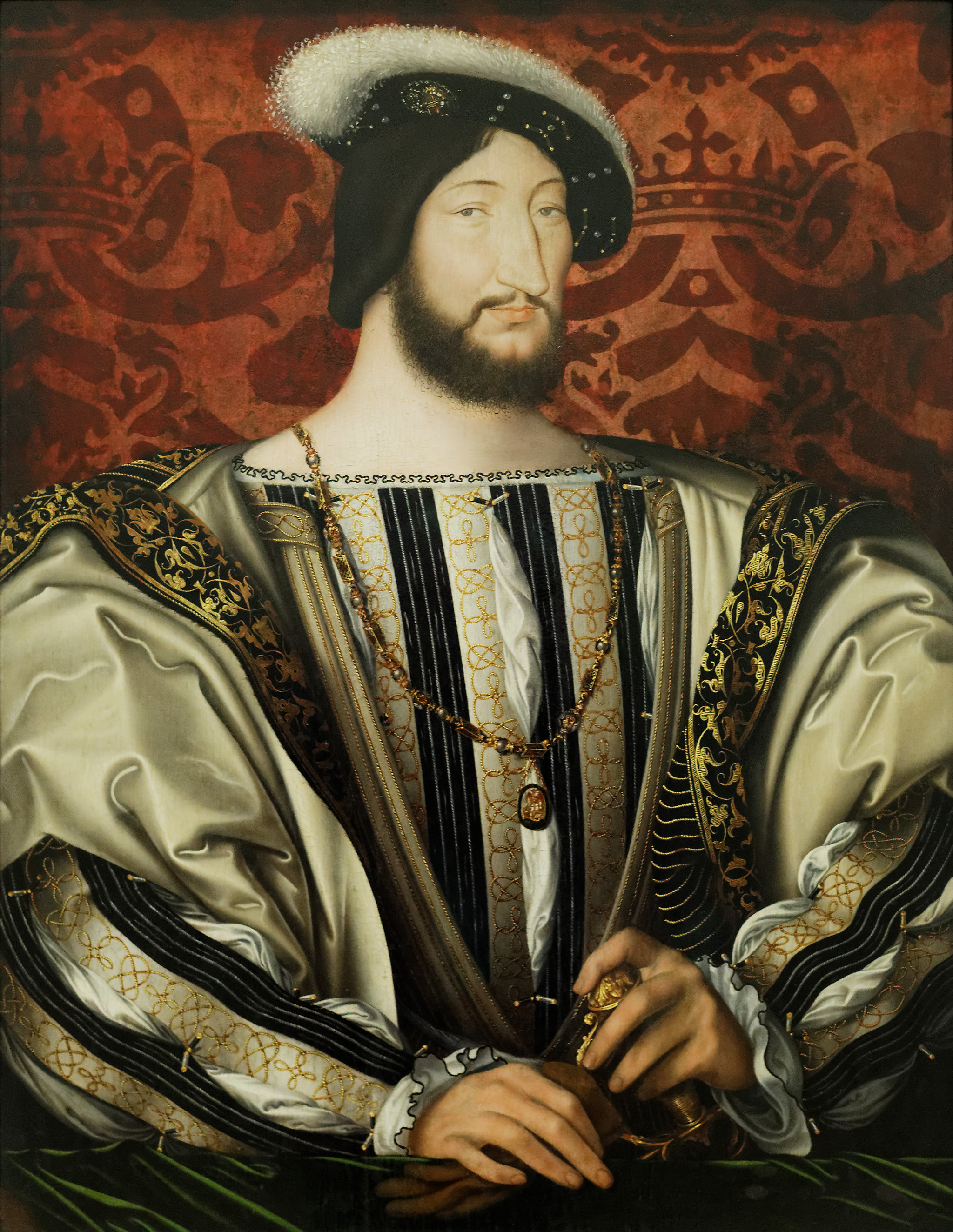
Francis I of France, whose personal enmity with Charles V was a major factor in the wars

Once Francis was free, his Council renounced the Treaty of Madrid, claiming conditions extorted under duress could not be considered binding. Concerned that Imperial power now posed a threat to Papal independence, on 22 May 1526 Clement VII formed the League of Cognac, whose members included France, the Papal States, Venice, Florence and Milan. Many of the Imperial troops were close to mutiny having not been paid for months and the Duke of Urbino, commander of the League army, hoped to take advantage of this confusion. However, he delayed taking the offensive awaiting additional Swiss reinforcements.

Although the League gained an easy victory on 24 June when the Venetians occupied Lodi, this delay allowed Charles to gather fresh troops and support a Milanese revolt in July against Francesco II Sforza, who was once again forced into exile. In September, Charles financed an attack on Rome by the Colonna family, who competed with the rival Orsinis for control of the city, and Clement was forced to pay them to withdraw. Seeking to recapture Milan, Francis invaded Lombardy at the beginning of 1527, with an army financed by Henry VIII, who hoped thereby to win Papal support for divorcing his first wife, Katherine of Aragon.

In May, Imperial troops, many of whom were followers of Martin Luther, sacked Rome and besieged Clement in the Castel Sant'Angelo, while Urbino and the League army sat outside and failed to intervene. Although the French marched south to relieve Rome, they were too late to prevent Clement making peace with Charles V in November. Meanwhile, Venice, the largest and most powerful of the Italian states and which also possessed the most effective army, now refused to contribute any more troops to the League. Weakened by its losses in 1509 to 1517 and with its maritime possessions increasingly threatened by the Ottomans, under Andrea Gritti the Republic tried to remain neutral and after 1529 avoided participation in the fighting.

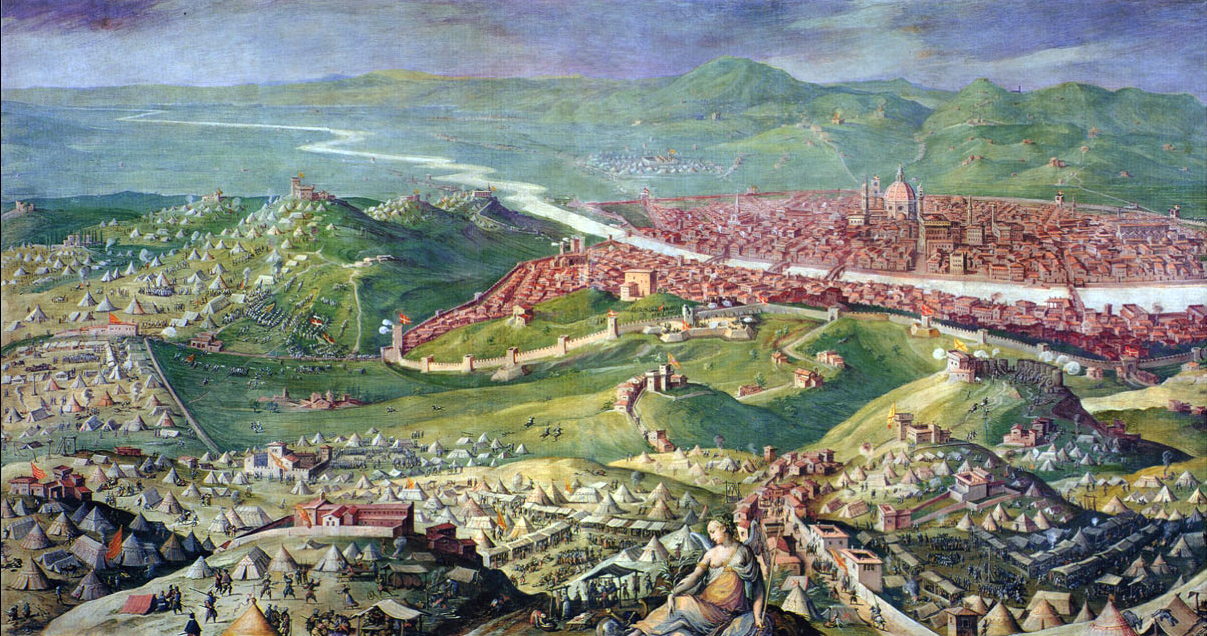
The 10-month Siege of Florence by the Spanish ended the Republic of Florence and Alessandro de' Medici became the ruler of the city.

Supported by a Genoese fleet, in April 1528 a French expeditionary force besieged Naples before disease forced them to withdraw in August. Both sides were now anxious to end the war and after another French defeat at Landriano on 21 June 1529, Francis agreed the Treaty of Cambrai with Charles in August. Known as the "Peace of the Ladies" because it was negotiated by Francis's mother, Louise of Savoy, and Charles's aunt Margaret, Francis recognised Charles as ruler of Milan, Naples, Flanders and Artois. Venice also made peace, leaving only Florence, which had expelled their Medici rulers in 1527. At Bologna in the summer of 1529, Charles V was named King of Italy; he agreed to restore the Medici on behalf of Pope Clement, who was himself a Medici, and after a lengthy siege, Florence surrendered in August 1530.

Prior to 1530, interference by foreign powers in Italy was viewed as a short-term problem, since they could not sustain it over time; for example, French conquests of Naples in 1494 and 1501 and Milan in 1499 and 1515 were quickly reversed. On the other hand, Venice was generally viewed by other states as the greatest threat because it was an Italian power. Many assumed the primacy established at Bologna by Charles V in Italy would also soon pass but instead it was the start of a long period of Habsburg dominance. One factor was Venice's withdrawal from Italian affairs after 1530 in favour of protecting its maritime empire from Ottoman expansion.

=== Italian War of 1536–1538 ===
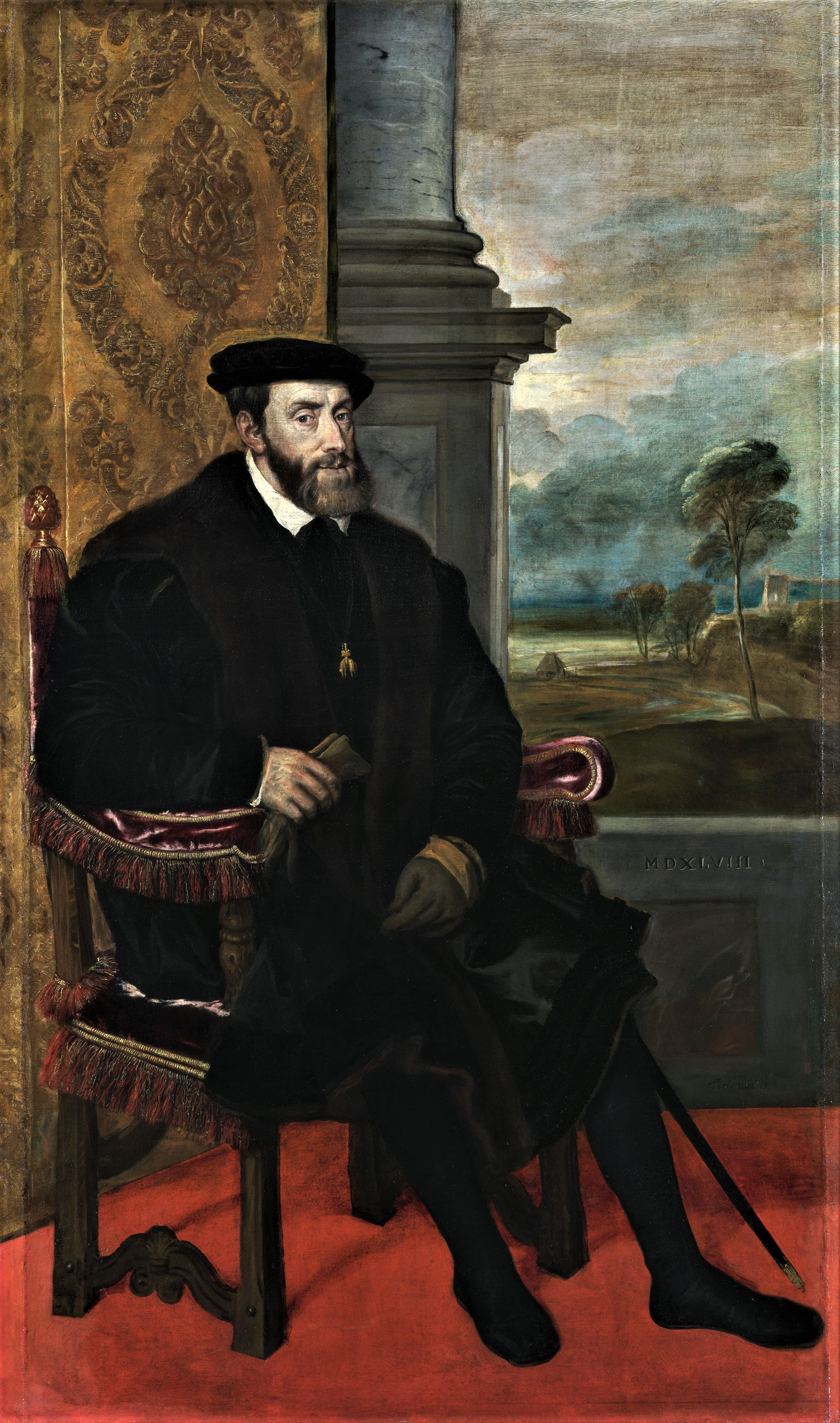
Emperor Charles V, c. 1548

Under the Treaty of Cambrai, Francesco II Sforza was reinstated as Duke of Milan; since he had no children, it also stated Charles V would inherit the duchy on his death, which occurred on 1 November 1535. Francis refused to accept this, arguing Milan was rightfully his along with Genoa and Asti, (Note: Asti had been a Valois possession from 1380 until 1526, when Charles acquired it through the Treaty of Cambrai) and once again prepared for war. In April 1536, pro-Valois elements in Asti expelled the Imperial garrison and a French army under Philippe de Chabot occupied Turin, although they failed to take Milan.

In response, a Spanish army invaded Provence and captured Aix on 13 August 1536, before withdrawing, a fruitless expedition that diverted resources from Italy, where the situation had become more serious. The 1536 Franco-Ottoman alliance, a comprehensive treaty covering a wide range of commercial and diplomatic issues, also agreed to a joint assault on Genoa, with French land forces supported by an Ottoman fleet.

Finding the garrison of Genoa had recently been reinforced while a planned internal uprising failed to materialise, the French instead occupied the towns of Pinerolo, Chieri and Carmagnola in Piedmont. Fighting continued in Flanders and northern Italy throughout 1537, while the Ottoman fleet raided the coastal areas around Naples, raising fears of invasion throughout Italy. Pope Paul III, who had replaced Clement in 1534, grew increasingly anxious to end the war and brought the two sides together at Nice in May 1538. The Truce of Nice, signed on 18 June, agreed to a ten-year halt in hostilities and left France in possession of most of Savoy, Piedmont and Artois.

=== Italian War of 1542–1546 ===
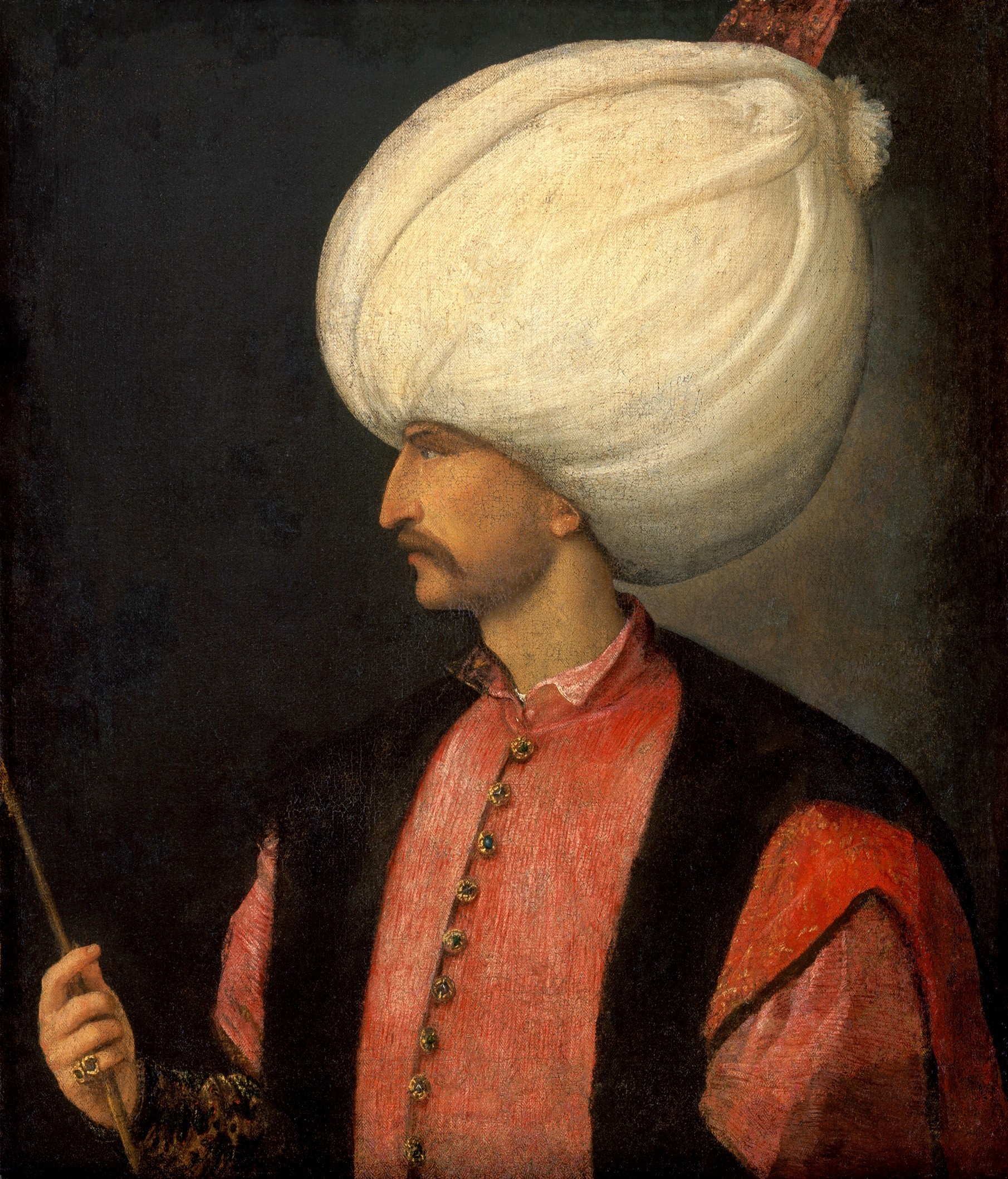
Suleiman the Magnificent, whose alliance with France led to Ottoman intervention in the wars

The 1538 truce failed to resolve underlying tensions between Francis, who still claimed Milan, and Charles, who insisted he comply with the treaties of Madrid and Cambrai. Their relationship collapsed in 1540 when Charles made his son Philip Duke of Milan, thus precluding any possibility it would revert to France. In 1541, Charles made a disastrous attack on Ottoman port of Algiers, which severely weakened his military and led Suleiman to reactivate his French alliance. With Ottoman support, on 12 July 1542 Francis once again declared war on the Holy Roman Empire, initiating the Italian War of 1542–46.

In August, French armies attacked Perpignan on the Spanish border, as well as Artois, Flanders and Luxemburg, a Valois possession prior to 1477. Imperial resistance proved far more formidable than expected, with most of these attacks easily repulsed and in 1543 Henry VIII allied with Charles and agreed to support his offensive in Flanders. Neither side made much progress, and although a combined Franco-Ottoman fleet under Hayreddin Barbarossa captured Nice on 22 August and besieged the citadel, the onset of winter and presence of a Spanish fleet forced them to withdraw. A joint attack by Christian and Islamic troops on a Christian town was regarded as shocking, especially when Francis allowed Barbarossa to use the French port of Toulon as a winter base.

On 14 April 1544, a French army commanded by Francis, Count of Enghien, defeated the Imperials at Ceresole, a victory of limited strategic value since they failed to make progress elsewhere in Lombardy. The Imperial position was further strengthened at Serravalle in June, when Alfonso d'Avalos defeated a mercenary force led by the Florentine exile Piero Strozzi on their way to meet Enghien. An English army captured Boulogne on 10 September, while Imperial forces advanced to within 100 kilometres (60 miles) of Paris. However, with his treasury exhausted and concerned by Ottoman naval strength in the Mediterranean Sea, on 14 September Charles agreed the Treaty of Crépy with Francis, which essentially restored the position to that prevailing in 1542. The agreement excluded Henry VIII, whose war with France continued until the two countries made peace in 1546 and confirmed his possession of Boulogne.

=== Italian War of 1551–1559 ===
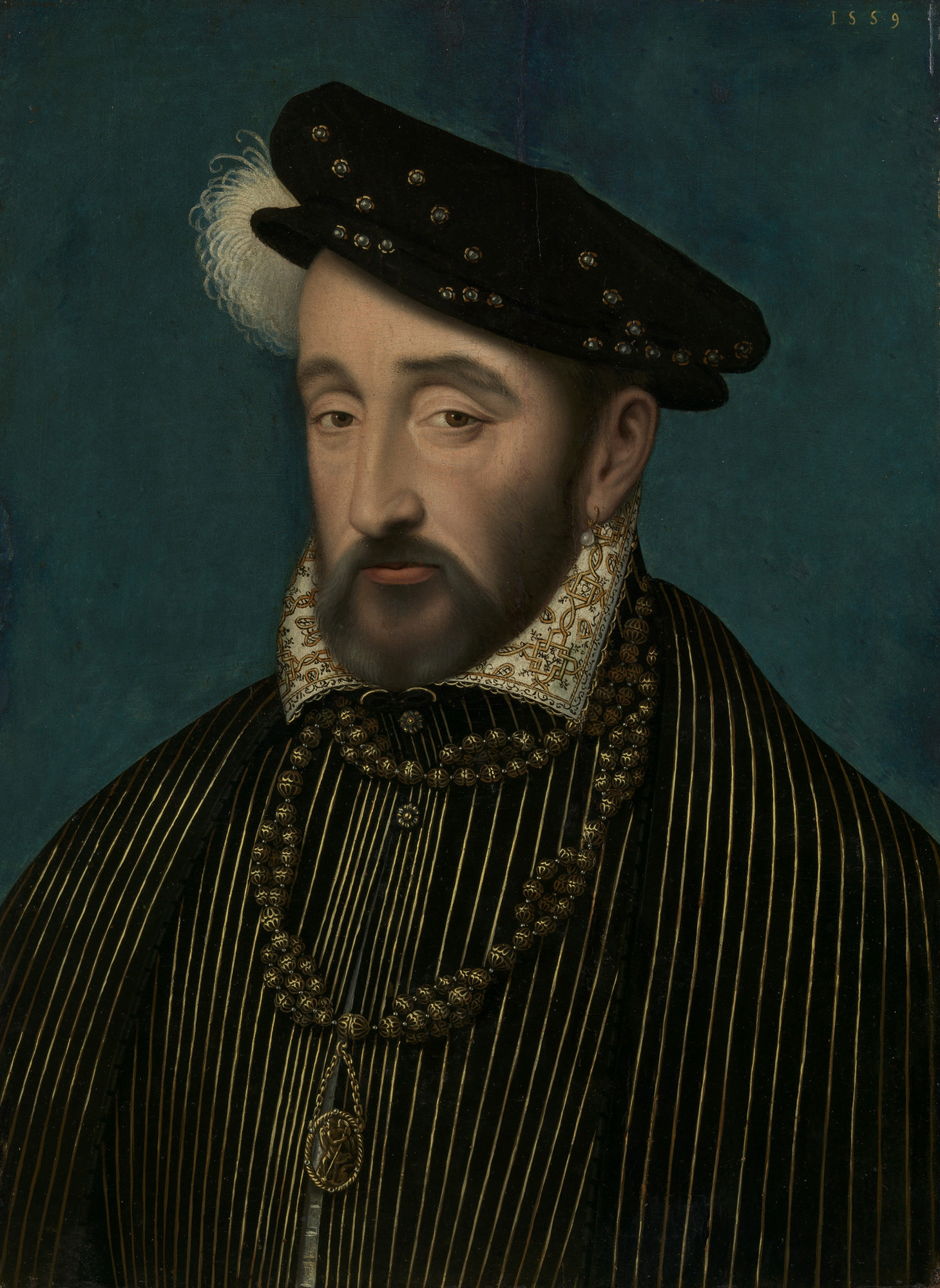
Henry II of France, who succeeded his father in 1547

Francis died on 31 March 1547 and was succeeded by his son, Henry II of France. He continued attempts to restore the French position in Italy, encouraged by Italian exiles and his cousin Francis, Duke of Guise, who claimed the throne of Naples through his grandfather René II, Duke of Lorraine. Henry first strengthened his diplomatic position by reactivating the Franco-Ottoman alliance and supporting their capture of Tripoli in August 1551. Despite his devout personal Catholicism and persecution of Huguenot "heretics" at home, in January 1552 he signed the Treaty of Chambord with several Protestant princes within the Empire, which gave him control of the Three Bishoprics of Toul, Verdun, and Metz.

Following the outbreak of the Second Schmalkaldic War in March 1552, French troops occupied the Three Bishoprics and invaded Lorraine. In 1553, a Franco-Ottoman force captured the Genoese island of Corsica, while supported by Henry's wife, Catherine de' Medici, French-backed Tuscan exiles seized control of Siena. This brought Henry into conflict with the ruler of Florence, Cosimo de' Medici, who defeated a French army at Marciano on 2 August 1554; although Siena held out until April 1555, it was absorbed by Florence and in 1569 became part of the Grand Duchy of Tuscany.

In July 1554, Philip II of Spain became king of England through his marriage to Mary I, and in November he also received the kingdoms of Naples and Sicily from his father, who reconfirmed him as duke of Milan. In January 1556, Charles formally abdicated as Holy Roman Emperor and split his possessions; the Holy Roman Empire went to his brother Ferdinand I, while Spain, its overseas territories and the Spanish Netherlands were assigned to Philip. Over the next century, Naples and Lombardy became a major source of men and money for the Spanish Army of Flanders during the 1568 to 1648 Eighty Years' War.

England entered the war in June 1557 and the focus shifted to Flanders, where a Spanish army defeated the French at St. Quentin on 10 August. Despite this, in January 1558 the French took Calais; held by the English since 1347, its loss severely diminished their future ability to intervene directly in mainland Europe. They also captured Thionville in June but peace negotiations had already begun, with Henry absorbed by the internal conflict that led to the French Wars of Religion in 1562. The Treaty of Cateau-Cambrésis on 3 April 1559 brought the Italian wars to an end. Corsica was returned to Genoa, while Emmanuel Philibert, Duke of Savoy, re-established the Savoyard state in northern Italy as an independent entity. France retained Calais and the Three Bishoprics, while other provisions essentially returned the position to that prevailing in 1551. Finally, Henry II and Philip II agreed to ask Pope Pius IV to recognise Ferdinand as emperor, and reconvene the Council of Trent.

== Aftermath ==
=== Results ===
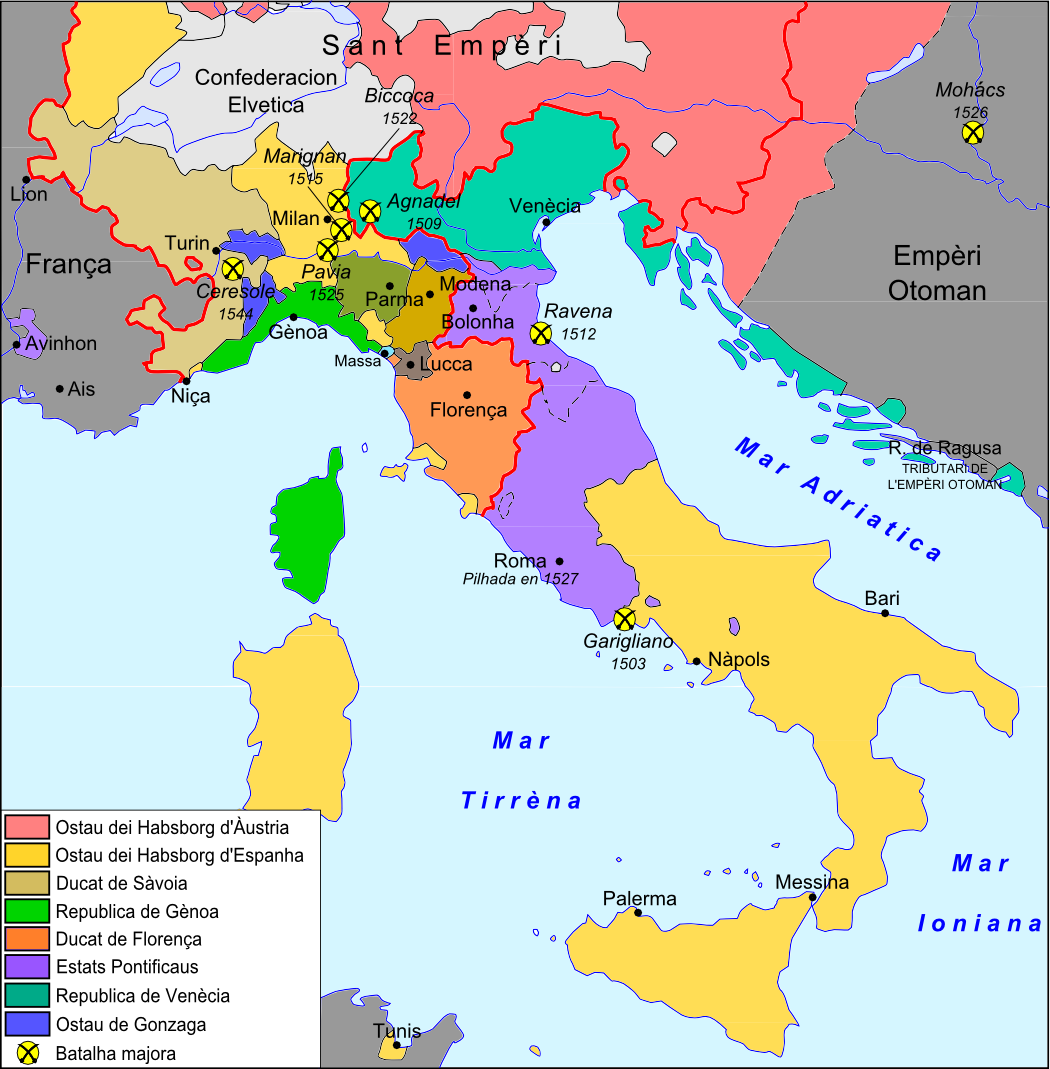
Italy in 1559

The European balance of power changed significantly during the Italian Wars. The affirmation of French power in Italy around 1494 brought Austria and Spain to join an anti-French league that formed the "Habsburg ring" around France (Low Countries, Aragon, Castile, Empire) via dynastic marriages that eventually led to the large inheritance of Charles V. On the other hand, the last Italian war ended with the division of the Habsburg empire between the Spanish and Austrian Habsburgs following the abdication of Charles V. Philip II of Spain was heir of the kingdoms held by Charles V in Spain, southern Italy, and the Americas. Ferdinand I was the successor of Charles V in the Holy Roman Empire extending from Germany to northern Italy and became suo jure king of the Habsburg monarchy. The Habsburg Netherlands and the Duchy of Milan were left in personal union to the king of Spain while continuing to be part of the Holy Roman Empire.

The division of the Empire of Charles V, along with the capture of the Pale of Calais and the Three Bishoprics, was a positive result for France. However, the Habsburgs had gained a position of primacy in Italy at the expense of the French Valois. In return, France was forced to end opposition to Habsburg power and abandon its claims in Italy. Henry II also restored the Savoyard state to Emmanuel Philibert, who settled in Piedmont, and Corsica to the Republic of Genoa. For this reason, the conclusion of the Italian Wars for France is considered to be a mixed result.

At the end of the wars, about half of Italy was ruled by the Spanish Habsburgs, including all of the south (Naples, Sicily, Sardinia) and the Duchy of Milan; the other half of Italy remained independent (although the north was largely formed by formal fiefs of the Austrian Habsburgs as part of the Holy Roman Empire). The most significant Italian power left was the papacy in central Italy, as it maintained major cultural and political influence during the Catholic Reformation. The Council of Trent, suspended during the war, was reconvened by the terms of the peace treaties and came to an end in 1563.

=== Interpretations ===
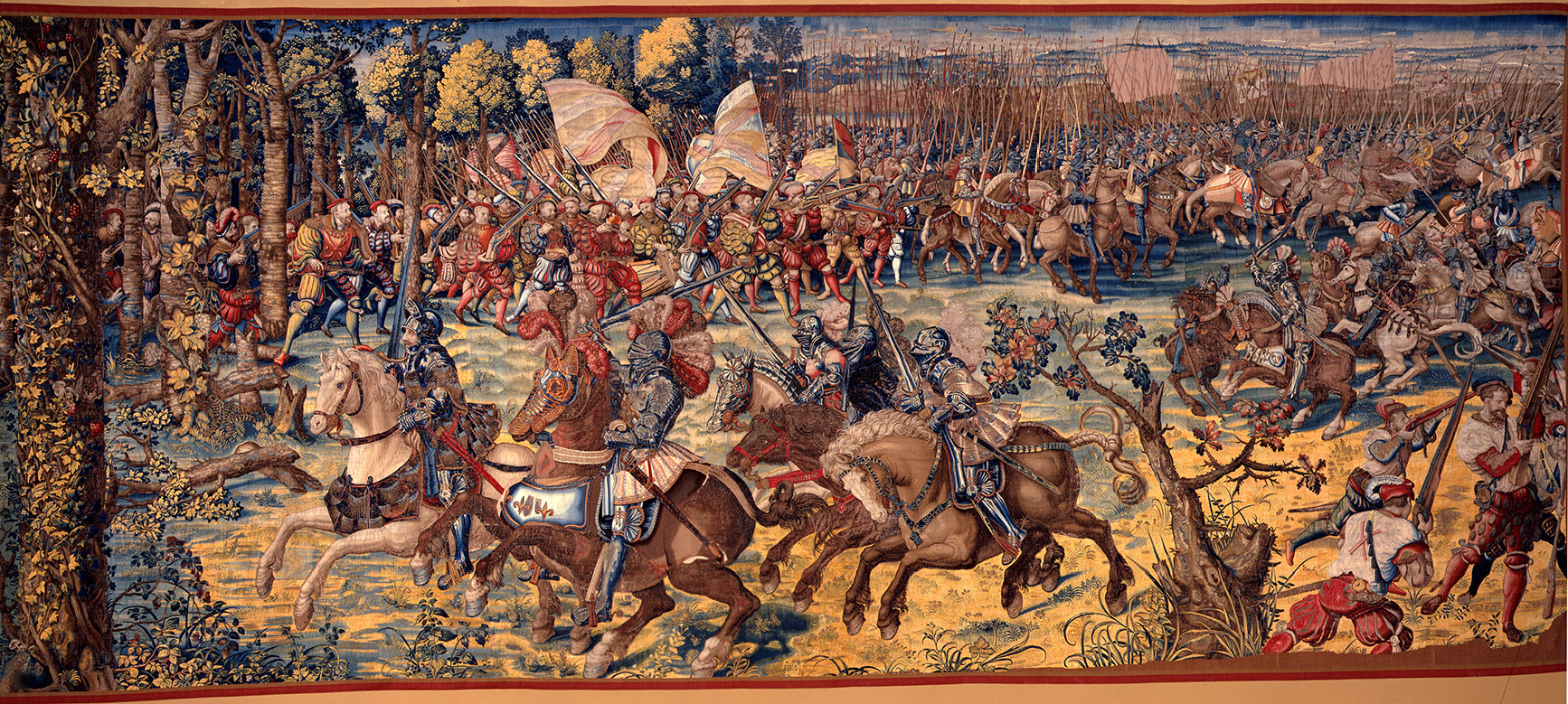
Detail of a tapestry depicting the Battle of Pavia, woven from a cartoon by Bernard van Orley (c. 1531)

As in the case of France, the Habsburg result is also variously interpreted. Many historians in the 20th century, including Garrett Mattingly, Eric Cochrane and Manuel F. Alvarez, identified the Peace of Cateau-Cambrésis as the beginning of a Spanish hegemony in Italy. However, this view has been contested and abandoned in 21st-century historiography. Christine Shaw, Micheal J. Levin, and William Reger reject the concept of a Spanish hegemony on the ground that too many limits prevented Spain's dominance in the peninsula, and maintain that other powers also held major influence in Italy after 1559. Although Spain gained control of about half of the Italian states, the other half remained independent; among them, the Papacy in particular emerged strengthened by the conclusion of the Council of Trent according to the scholars Antelantonio Spagnoletti and Benedetto Croce. Furthermore, according to the historians Christine Shaw and Salvatore Puglisi, the Holy Roman Empire continued to play a role in Italian politics. Peter J. Wilson writes that three overlapping and competing feudal networks, Imperial, Spanish, and Papal, were affirmed in Italy as a result of the end of the wars.

In the long-term, Habsburg primacy in Italy continued to exist, but it varied significantly due to the change of dynasties in Austria and Spain. Following the War of the Spanish Succession and other wars of succession, the Habsburg-Lorraine of Austria largely replaced Spain and gained direct or indirect control of the fiefs of Imperial Italy, whereas the south eventually passed to an independent branch of the Spanish Bourbons. France would return in Italy to confront Habsburg power, first under Louis XIV, and later under Napoleon, but only the unification of Italy would permanently remove foreign powers from the peninsula.

Charles Tilly has characterized the Italian Wars as a key part in his theory of state formation, as the wars demonstrated the value of large armies and superior military technology. In Coercion, Capital, and European States, AD 990–1992, Tilly argues that a "comprehensive European state system" can be reasonably dated to the Italian Wars.

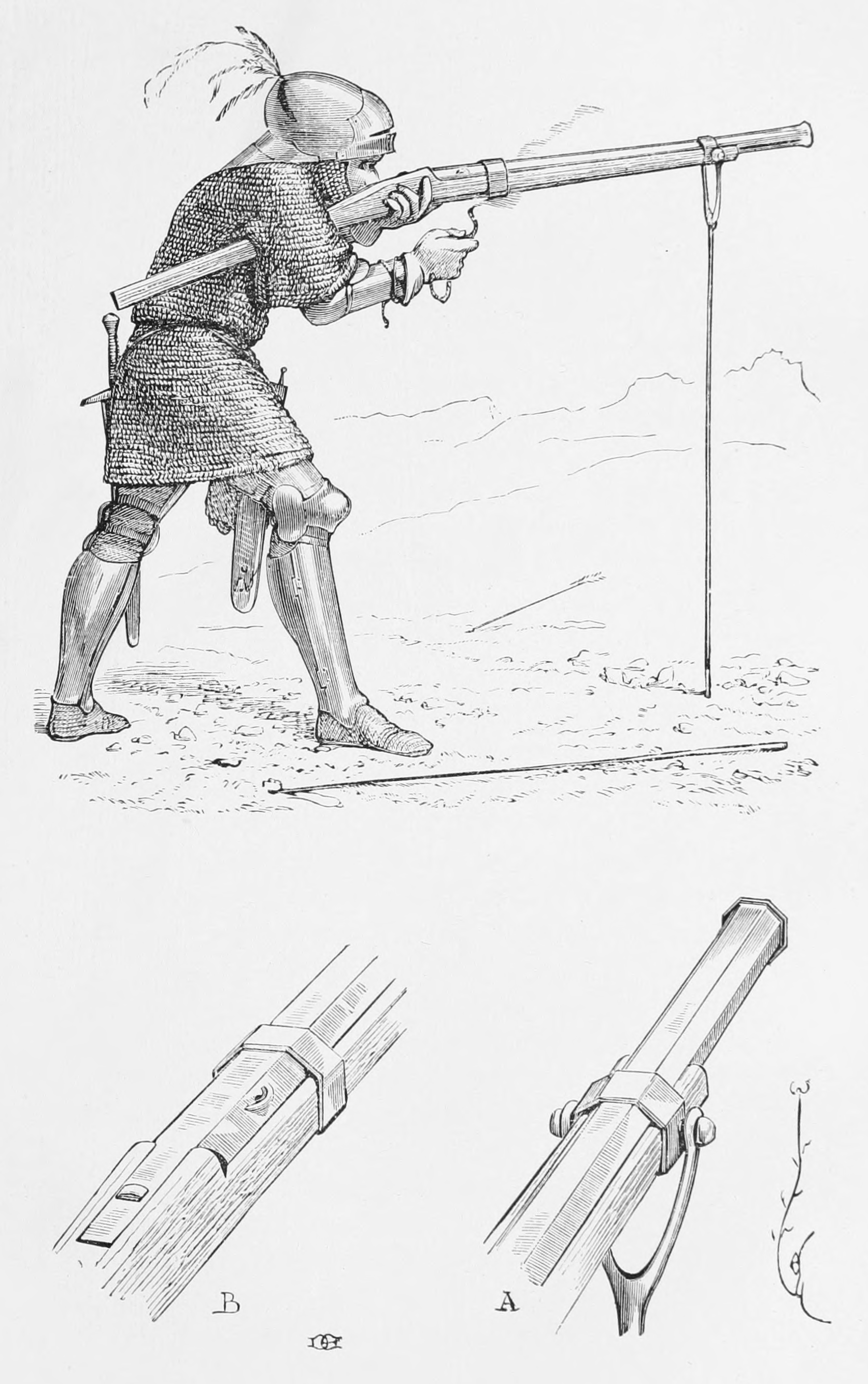
Arquebusier using a rest (1876 representation)

== Military ==
The Italian Wars represented a revolution in military technology and tactics, some historians suggesting they form the dividing point between modern and medieval battlefields. Contemporary historian Francesco Guicciardini wrote of the initial 1494 French invasion that "...sudden and violent wars broke out, ending with the conquest of a state in less time than it used to take to occupy a villa. The siege and taking of a city became extremely rapid and achieved not in months but in days and hours".

Infantry underwent profound developments during the Italian Wars, evolving from a primary pike- and halberd-wielding force to a more flexible arrangement of arquebusiers, pikemen, and other troops. While landsknechts and Swiss mercenaries continued to dominate during the early part of the wars, the Italian War of 1521 demonstrated the power of massed firearms in pike and shot formations.

A 1503 skirmish between French and Spanish forces first demonstrated the utility of arquebuses in battle. The Spanish general, Gonzalo de Córdoba, faked a retreat, luring a contingent of French men-at-arms between two groups of his arquebusiers. As the French army stepped between the marksmen, volleys of bullets battered them on both flanks. Before the French could attack the vulnerable arquebusiers, a Spanish cavalry charge broke the French forces and forced their retreat. While the French army escaped, the Spanish inflicted severe casualties.

So successful was the employment of firearms in the Italian Wars that Niccolò Machiavelli, often characterized as an enemy of the use of the arquebus, wrote in his treatise on The Art of War that all citizens in a city should know how to fire a gun.

=== Veterans turned conquistadors ===
Many conquistadors, such as Hernán Cortés, had considered Italy before opting to serve in Spanish America, while large numbers of veterans from Naples and southern Italy later emigrated there, either as colonists or soldiers. Experience in Italy was often considered a prerequisite for military employment, although the chronicler Gonzalo Fernández de Oviedo y Valdés claimed those who did so must have "failed to become rich,...gambled the riches away or [somehow] lost them" and suggested conditions in the Americas were far tougher. Francisco Sebastián, an Italian veteran who accompanied Hernando de Soto on his expedition into North America, agreed with this assessment, largely because "no plunder of value could be obtained" from the inhabitants.

Italian veterans included Diego Velázquez de Cuéllar, who conquered Cuba in 1511, Francisco de Carvajal and Pedro de Valdivia, both of whom fought at Pavia in 1526. Carvajal and Valdivia served with the Pizarro brothers in Peru during their conflict with Spanish rival Diego de Almagro in 1538. Carvajal remained with the Pizarros while Valdivia began the conquest of Chile and ignited the Arauco War. The two men fought on opposite sides in the 1548 Battle of Jaquijahuana; Carvajal was executed after being taken prisoner, while Valdivia died in 1553 at Tucapel.

=== Cavalry ===
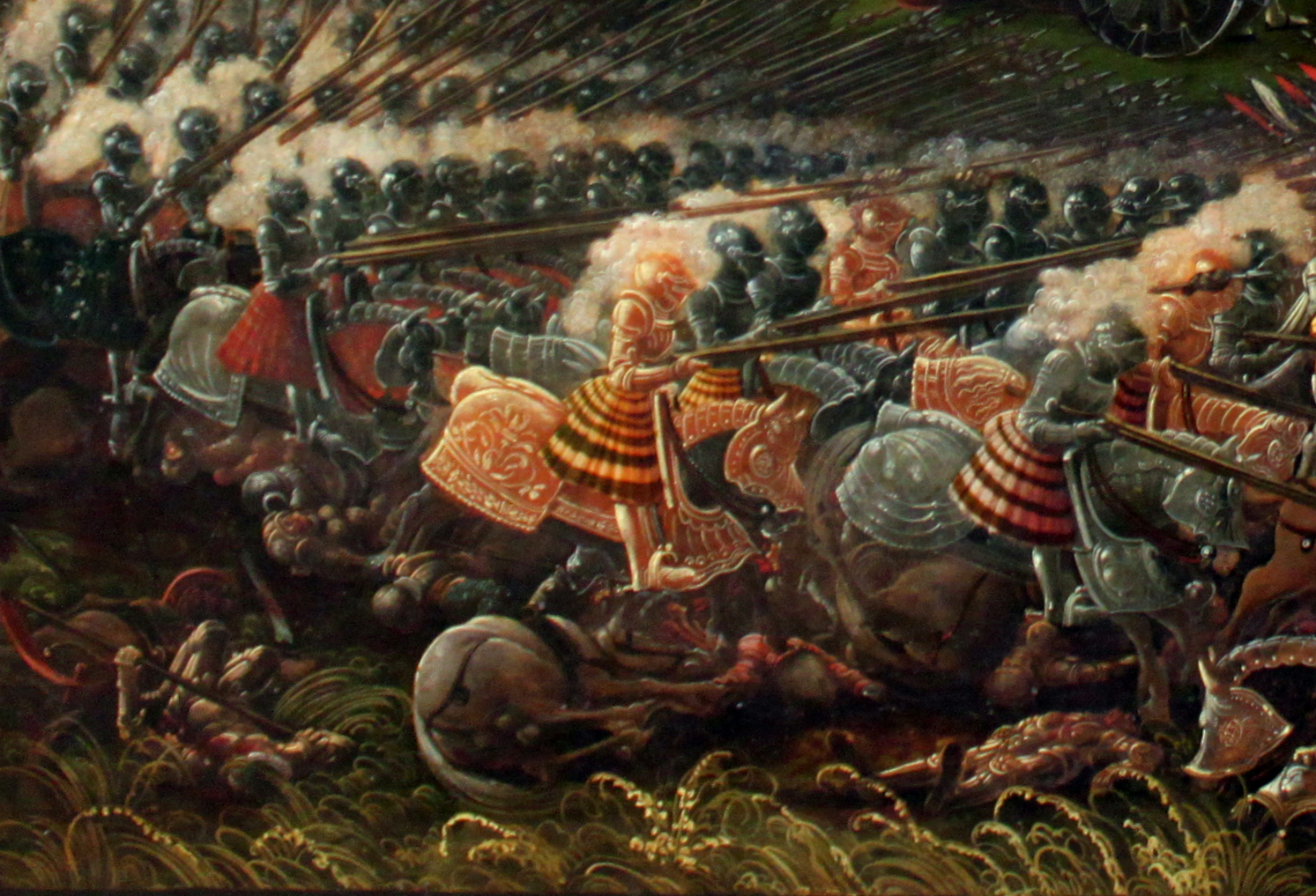
French heavy cavalry, early 16th century

Heavy cavalry, the final evolution of the fully armoured medieval knight, remained significant players on the battlefields of the Italian Wars. Largely due to their excellent horses, French gendarmes were generally successful against heavy mounted troops from other states, but were very vulnerable to pikemen. The Spanish used heavy cavalry and light cavalry, or Jinetes, for skirmishing.

=== Artillery ===
Artillery, particularly field artillery, became an indispensable part of any first-rate army during the wars. When Charles VIII invaded in 1494, he brought with him the first truly mobile siege train of culverins and bombards. It included various innovations, such as mounting the guns on wheeled carriages, drawn by horses rather than oxen as was the custom, which allowed them to be deployed against an enemy stronghold on arrival. This mobility stemmed from their lightness, achieved by employing the methods used to cast bronze church bells. Perhaps the most important improvement was the creation of the iron cannonball, rather than the stone balls that often shattered on impact. The combination meant Charles could level in an hour castles that had resisted sieges for months or even years.

== See also ==
- List of military leaders of the Italian Wars

== Sources ==
- Arfaioli, Maurizio (2005). The Black Bands of Giovanni: Infantry and Diplomacy During the Italian Wars (1526–1528). Pisa University Press. ISBN 8884922313.
- Armstrong, Edward (October 1915). "The Italian Wars of Henry II". The English Historical Review. 30 (120): 602–614. doi:10.1093/ehr/XXX.CXX.602. JSTOR 551298.
- Arnold, Thomas F (2006). Keegan, John (ed.). The Renaissance at War in the Smithsonian History of Warfare. Collins. ISBN 0060891955.
- Baumgartner, Frederic J (1994). Louis XII. St Martin's Press. ISBN 0312120729.
- Black, Jeremy (Spring 2006). "Dynasty Forged by Fire". The Quarterly Journal of Military History. 18 (3): 34–43. ISSN 1040-5992.
- Black, Jeremy (2002). European Warfare, 1494–1660 in Warfare and History. Routledge. ISBN 0415275326.
- Blockmans, Wim (2002). Emperor Charles V, 1500–1558. Translated by Hoven-Vardon, Isola van den. Oxford University Press. ISBN 0340731109.
- Boot, Max (2006). War Made New: Technology, Warfare, and the Course of History, 1500 to Today. Gotham Books. ISBN 978-1592402229.
- Bowd, Stephen (2018). Renaissance Mass Murder: Civilians and Soldiers During the Italian Wars. OUP. ISBN 978-0198832614.
- Braudel, Fernand (1996). The Mediterranean and the Mediterranean World in the Age of Philip II; Volume II. University of California Press. ISBN 978-0520203303.
- Brigden, Susan; Woolfson, Jonathan (2005). "Thomas Wyatt in Italy". Renaissance Quarterly. 58 (2): 464–511. doi:10.1353/ren.2008.0704. S2CID 154848645.
- Corio, Bernardino (1565). L'Historia di Milano (in Italian). Giorgio de' Cavalli.
- Finlay, Robert (1999). "The Immortal Republic: The Myth of Venice during the Italian Wars (1494–1530)". The Sixteenth Century Journal. 30 (4): 931–944. doi:10.2307/2544605. JSTOR 2544605. S2CID 165704017.
- Delbrück, Hans (1920). History of the Art of War. Translated by Renfroe, Walter J (1990 ed.). University of Nebraska Press.
- Espino López, Antonio (2012). "El uso táctico de las armas de fuego en las guerras civiles peruanas (1538–1547)". Historica (in Spanish). 36 (2): 7–48. doi:10.18800/historica.201202.001. S2CID 258861207.
- Fraser, Antonia (1969). Mary, Queen of Scots. Delacorte Press.
- Frieda, Leonie (2004). Francis I: The Maker of Modern France (2021 ed.). W&N Press. ISBN 978-1474601221.
- Guérard, Albert (1959). France: A Modern History. University of Michigan Press. ISBN 978-0582057586.
- Guicciardini, Francesco (1753). The History of Italy. Translated by Goddard, Austin Parke. John Towers.
- Guicciardini, Francesco (1984). The History of Italy. Translated by Alexander, Sydney. Princeton University Press. ISBN 0691008000.
- Guicciardini, Francesco (1964). The History of Florence. Translated by Grayson, Cecil. Twayne Publishing.
- Hall, Bert S (1997). Weapons and Warfare in Renaissance Europe: Gunpowder, Technology, and Tactics. Johns Hopkins University Press. ISBN 0801855314.
- Horodowich, Elizabeth (2017). The New World in early modern Italy, 1492–1750. Cambridge University Press. ISBN 978-1107122871.
- Inalcik, Halil (2000). The Ottoman Empire: The Classical Age 1300–1600. Orion Publishing Group. ISBN 978-1842124420.
- Kamen, Henry (2002). Spain's Road to Empire (2003 ed.). Allen Lane. ISBN 978-0140285284.
- Knecht, Robert J (1994). Renaissance Warrior and Patron: The Reign of Francis I. Cambridge University Press. ISBN 052157885X.
- Konstam, Angus. Pavia 1525: The Climax of the Italian Wars. Oxford: Osprey Publishing, 1996. ISBN 1855325047.
- Konstam, Angus (2004). Historical Atlas of the Renaissance. Facts on File. ISBN 978-0816057313.
- Levin, Michael (2005). Agents of Empire: Spanish Ambassadors in Sixteenth-century Italy. Cornell University Press. ISBN 978-0801443527.
- Lesaffer, Randall (2004). Peace Treaties and International Law in European History: From the Late Middle Ages to World War One. Cambridge University Press. ISBN 978-0521827249.
- Lucas, Henry S (1960). The Renaissance and the Reformation. Harper Brothers.
- Machiavelli, Niccolò (2003). The Art of War. Translated by Lynch, Christopher. University of Chicago Press.
- Mallett, Michael; Shaw, Christine (2012). The Italian Wars: 1494–1559. Pearson Education. ISBN 978-0582057586.
- Mattingly, Garrett (1963). "No Peace Beyond What Line?". Transactions of the Royal Historical Society. 13: 145–162. doi:10.2307/3678733. JSTOR 3678733. S2CID 154418252.
- Morris, T.A (2002). Europe and England in the Sixteenth Century. Routledge. ISBN 0203014634.
- Nigro, Louis J (2010). Bartholomees, J Boone (ed.). Theory and Practice of Modern Diplomacy: Origins and Development to 1914 in 'Theory of War and Strategy, Volume 1'. US Army War College. pp. 173–186.
- Norwich, John Julius. A History of Venice. New York: Vintage Books, 1989. ISBN 0679721975.
- Oman, Charles. A History of the Art of War in the Sixteenth Century. London: Methuen & Co., 1937.
- Parker, Geoffrey (2019). Emperor: A New Life of Charles V. Yale University Press. ISBN 978-0300241020.
- Piccirillo, Anthony Carmen (2009). "A Vile, Infamous, Diabolical Treaty": The Franco-Ottoman Alliance of Francis I and the Eclipse of the Christendom Ideal (PDF) (PHD). Georgetown University.
- Phillips, Charles and Alan Axelrod. Encyclopedia of Wars. 3 vols. New York: Facts on File, 2005. ISBN 0816028516.
- Pollard, A.F (1908). "Reviewed Work: Letters and Papers, Foreign and Domestic, of the Reign of Henry VIII Preserved in the Record Office, the British Museum, and Elsewhere in England by James Gairdner, R. H. Brodie". The English Historical Review. 23 (90): 358–361. doi:10.1093/ehr/XXIII.XC.358. JSTOR 550031.
- Potter, David (2008). Renaissance France at War: Armies, Culture and Society, c. 1480–1560. Boydell Press. ISBN 978-1843834052.
- Romane, Julian (2020). The First and Second Italian Wars 1494–1504: Fearless Knights, Ruthless Princes and the Coming of Gunpowder Armies. Pen and Sword Military. ISBN 978-1526750518.
- Rosenblat, Angel; Tejera, María Josefina (2002). El español de América (in Spanish). Biblioteca Ayacucho. ISBN 9802763519.
- Sanudo, Marin (1883). La spedizione di Carlo VIII in Italia (in Italian). Mancia del Commercio di M. Visentini.
- Setton, Kenneth M (1976). The Papacy and the Levant, 1204–1571. American Philosophical Society. ISBN 978-0871691620.
- Smith, Rhea Marsh (1965). Spain: A Modern History. University of Michigan Press.
- Taylor, Frederick Lewis.The Art of War in Italy 1494–1529. Greenwood Press, 1973. ISBN 0837150256.
- Tilly, Charles (1990). Coercion, Capital, and European States, AD 990–1990 (1993 ed.). Wiley Blackwell. ISBN 978-1557863683.
- Tol, Jonas van (2016). Germany and the Coming of the French Wars of Religion: Confession, Identity, and Transnational Relations (PDF) (PHD). University of York.
- Wilson, Peter; Evans, Robert (2012). The Holy Roman Empire, 1495–1806: A European Perspective. BRILL. ISBN 978-9004206830.
