= List of military leaders of the Italian Wars =

Key: Allegiance
France
Holy Roman Empire/Spain
England
Independent Italian states (Republic of Venice, Papal States, Florence, Duchy of Milan, and others)
Changed allegiance
Other

This is a list of military leaders of the Italian Wars.

Portrait	Name	Allegiance	Notes
	Pierre Terrail, Seigneur de Bayard	France	
	Gonzalo Fernández de Córdoba	Spain	
	Francesco II Gonzaga, Marquess of Mantua	Republic of Venice	
	Pierre Terrail, Seigneur de Bayard	France	
	Louis d'Armagnac, Duke of Nemours	France	Killed at the Battle of Cerignola.
	Gonzalo Fernández de Córdoba	Spain	
	Pedro Navarro, Count of Oliveto	Spain (until 1512); France (after 1515)	Captured by the French at the Battle of Ravenna (1512). Entered the service of Francis I of France in 1515.
	Gian Giacomo Trivulzio	France	
	Pierre Terrail, Seigneur de Bayard	France	
	Gaston de Foix, Duc de Nemours	France	Killed at the Battle of Ravenna.
	Charles d'Amboise, Seigneur de Chaumont	France	
	Odet de Foix, Vicomte de Lautrec	France	
	Robert de la Marck, Seigneur de la Flourance	France	
	Franz von Sickingen	Holy Roman Empire	
	Ramon de Cardona	Spain	
	Fernando d'Avalos, Marquess of Pescara	Spain/Holy Roman Empire	Taken prisoner at the Battle of Ravenna, but permitted to ransom himself.
	Charles Brandon, 1st Duke of Suffolk	England	
	Niccolò di Pitigliano	Republic of Venice	
	Lucio Malvezzo	Republic of Venice	
	Fabrizio Colonna	Papal States	Taken prisoner at the Battle of Ravenna.
	Prospero Colonna	Papal States	Taken prisoner shortly before the Battle of Marignano.
	Francesco II Gonzaga, Marquess of Mantua	Papal States	
	Bartolomeo d'Alviano	Republic of Venice	Taken prisoner at the Battle of Agnadello, but later released.
	Andrea Doria	France	
	Pierre Terrail, Seigneur de Bayard	France	Killed at the Battle of the Sesia.
	Anne de Montmorency	France	Taken prisoner at the Battle of Pavia.
	Guillaume Gouffier, Seigneur de Bonnivet	France	Killed at the Battle of Pavia.
	Francis I of France	France	Taken prisoner at the Battle of Pavia.
	Richard de la Pole	France	Killed at the Battle of Pavia.
	Odet de Foix, Vicomte de Lautrec	France	
	Robert de la Marck, Seigneur de la Flourance	France	
	Charles de Lannoy	Holy Roman Empire/Spain	Viceroy of Naples; overall commander of the Imperial armies after the death of Prospero Colonna in 1523.
	Antonio de Leyva	Spain	
	Henry III of Nassau-Breda	Holy Roman Empire	
	Charles Brandon, 1st Duke of Suffolk	England	
	Prospero Colonna	Papal States	Overall commander of the Imperial forces until his death in 1523.
	Giovanni de' Medici	Papal States; Spain; France	
	Charles III, Duke of Bourbon	France; Holy Roman Empire (after 1523)	
	Odet de Foix, Vicomte de Lautrec	France	Died during the Siege of Naples.
	Giovanni de' Medici	France	Killed fighting near Mantua.
	Philibert of Châlon	Holy Roman Empire/Spain	Killed at the Battle of Gavinana.
	Charles III, Duke of Bourbon	Holy Roman Empire	Killed during the Sack of Rome.
	Georg von Frundsberg	Holy Roman Empire	
	Francesco Ferruccio	Florence	Killed at the Battle of Gavinana.
	Andrea Doria	France (1526–27); Spain (1528–29)	
	Sampieru Corsu	France	
	Francis, Duke of Guise	France	
	Sampieru Corsu	France	
	René of Châlon	Holy Roman Empire/Spain	
	Alfonso d'Avalos, Marquess del Vasto	Spain/Holy Roman Empire	
	Charles Brandon, 1st Duke of Suffolk	England	
	Barbarossa Hayreddin Pasha	Ottoman Empire	
	Sampieru Corsu	France	
