= Habsburg Austria =

The term Habsburg Austria may refer to the lands ruled by the Austrian branch of the Habsburgs, or the historical Austria. Depending on the context, it may be defined as:

- The Duchy of Austria, after 1453 the Archduchy of Austria
- The Erblande, Habsburg hereditary lands before 1526
- The Austrian Circle of the Holy Roman Empire
- The Habsburg monarchy as a whole, or after 1804 the Austrian Empire
- Cisleithania, the Austrian half of the Austro-Hungarian Empire from 1867 to 1918
