= Altoviti family =

Altoviti may refer to:

- Altoviti, prominent noble family of Florence, Italy
- Bindo Altoviti (1491 - 1557), banker and patron of the arts
- Portrait of Bindo Altoviti, painting by Raphael commissioned by Bindo Altoviti
- Madonna dell'Impanata, painting by Raphael commissioned by Bindo Altoviti
- Antonio Altoviti (1521 - 1573), Archbishop of Florence
- Giacomo Altoviti (1604 - 1693), Patriarch of Antiochia and Archbishop of Athenae
- Banking families
