= Papal household =

Collection of personal papal dignitaries

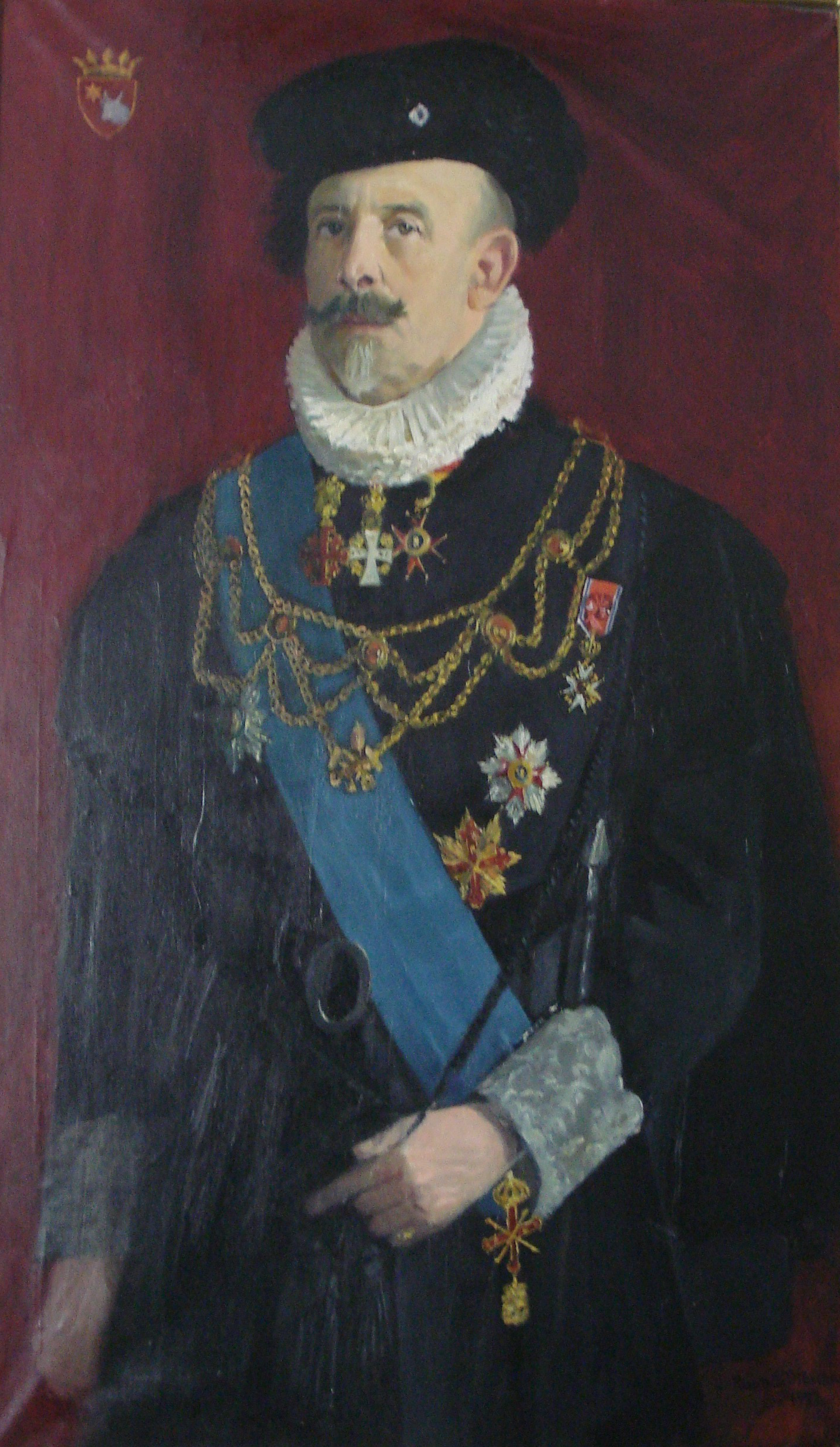
Christopher, Count de Paus (1862–1943), in the court dress of a papal chamberlain; he was a chamberlain to popes Benedict XV, Pius XI and Pius XII

The papal household or pontifical household (usually not capitalized in the media and other nonofficial use, Latin: Pontificalis Domus), called until 1968 the Papal Court (Aula Pontificia), consists of dignitaries who assist the Pope in carrying out particular ceremonies of either a religious or a civil character.

It is organised into two bodies: the Papal Chapel (Cappella Pontificia), which assists the pope in his functions as the earthly head of the Catholic Church, especially in religious ceremonies; and the Papal Family or Household (Familia Pontificia), which assists him as head of a juridical body with civil functions.

== Modern organisation ==
The Papal Household is a section of the Roman Curia. The Prefecture of the Papal Household is the office in charge of the Papal Household.

=== Papal Chapel ===
The Papal Chapel consists of ecclesiastics who participate in religious ceremonies wearing their liturgical vestments or the dress proper to their rank and office.

Historically, chanted divine service was held daily in the papal palace, with the Pope in person celebrating or assisting at Pontifical Mass on certain days. After the return of the popes from Avignon, these solemn public functions were held in the Sistine Chapel or, on days of special solemnity, in Saint Peter's Basilica. The liturgical celebration ceased to be daily in the course of the nineteenth century. The motu proprio Pontificalis Domus of 1968 abolished some of the titles borne by various groups that had membership in the Papal Chapel. (Note: The Annuario Pontificio of 1863 listed the membership of the Papal Chapel of that time on pages 343-366.) At present its membership consists of the ecclesiastical members of the Papal Family in the narrow sense (Familia Pontificalis, not Domus Pontificalis) and in addition:

1. The College of Cardinals
2. The patriarchs
3. The archbishops who head dicasteries of the Roman Curia
4. The Vice Camerlengo of the Holy Roman Church
5. The secretaries of the dicasteries of the Roman Curia
6. The regent of the Apostolic Penitentiary
7. The secretary of the Supreme Tribunal of the Apostolic Signatura
8. The dean of the Tribunal of the Roman Rota
9. The superiors of the pontifical commissions
10. The abbot of Montecassino and the abbots general of canons regular and monastic orders
11. The superior general or, in his absence, the procurator general of the mendicant orders
12. The prelate auditors of the Tribunal of the Roman Rota
13. The members of the chapters of the Vatican Basilica, the Lateran Archbasilica, and the Liberian Basilica
14. The parish priests (pastors) of Rome
15. The (two) clerics of the Papal Chapel
16. Those in the personal service of the Pope

=== Papal Family (Familia Pontificalis) ===
The members of this body are subdivided into two groups: ecclesiastic and lay. (Note: For the membership in 1863, see pages 367-392 of the Annuario Pontificio of that year.))

The ecclesiastics who have membership are:

1. The Substitute of the Secretariat of State
2. The Secretary for Relations with States
3. The Almoner of His Holiness
4. The President of the Pontifical Ecclesiastical Academy
5. The Theologian of the Pontifical Household
6. The College of the Apostolic Protonotaries Participating
7. The Supernumerary Apostolic Protonotaries
8. The Papal Masters of Ceremonies (Office for the Liturgical Celebrations of the Supreme Pontiff)
9. The Honorary Prelates of His Holiness
10. The Chaplains of His Holiness
11. The Preacher of the Papal Household

The lay members are:

1. Assistants at the Throne
2. The General Counsellor of the State of Vatican City
3. The Commandant of the Papal Swiss Guard
4. The Counsellors of the State of Vatican City
5. The President of the Pontifical Academy of Sciences
6. The Gentlemen of His Holiness
7. The Procurators of the Apostolic Palaces
8. The Attachés of the Antechamber
9. Those in the personal service of the Pope
10. The Aide de chambre
11. The Dean of the Hall of the Papal Antechamber

== History ==
=== Papal Court ===
By the late Middle Ages it was the most sophisticated bureaucracy in Europe. In the Papal States, from medieval times, the papal nobility formed a part of the Papal Court. The roles and positions in the papal household and court evolved and changed over time, and included hostiarii, vestararius, vicedominus, nomenclator, cubiculario (chamberlain), sacellarius, praelatini palatini, bibliothecarius, scutiferi, cancellarius, protonotaries, primicerius, secundicerius, defensor, and many more.

=== Reform of Paul VI ===
On March 28, 1968, Pope Paul VI reorganized the Papal Court with an apostolic letter motu proprio, renaming it the "Papal Household" (Latin: Pontificalis Domus). In changing the name from what it had been for some centuries, Paul VI said he was returning an "original and noble" name. Moreover, many positions were consolidated into new ones or altogether abolished. According to the motu proprio: "Many of the offices entrusted to members of the Papal Household were deprived of their function, continuing to exist as purely honorary positions, without much correspondence to concrete needs of the times."

In the Papal Chapel, the following positions were altered or suppressed: Palatine Cardinals (Cardinali Palatini); prelates di fiocchetto; Prince-Assistants to the Throne (Principi assistenti al Soglio); Majordomo of His Holiness; the Interior Minister; Commander of Santo Spirito; Roman Magistrate; Master of the Sacred Apostolic Hospice; Chamberlains of Honor in abito paonazzo; Secret Chaplains and Secret Chaplains of Honor; Secret Clerics; Confessor of the Pontifical Family; Candle-Carrying Acolytes (Ceroferari); Guardian of the Sacred Tiara; Mace-Bearer; and Apostolic Messenger (Cursori Apostolici). Of these offices, the suppressed offices of Secret Chaplain and Secret Chaplain of Honor, Secret Cleric, Acolyte Ceroferari, Common Papal Chaplain, and Porter-Masters of the Virga Rubea were consolidated under the general title of "Cleric of the Papal Chapel".

The Papal Family underwent even more radical changes. Abolished and considered were the following titles: the Palatine prelates (i.e., Majordomo of His Holiness, Master of the Chamber [Maestro di Camera], Auditor of His Holiness); Master of the Sacred Apostolic Hospice; the Hereditary Quartermaster General of the Sacred Apostolic Palace (Foriere Maggiore); Master of the Horse to His Holiness (Cavallerizzo Maggiore di Sua Santità); General Superintendent of Posts; the Keepers of the Golden Rose; Secretary to Embassies; Esente of the Noble Guard of Service; Chamberlains of Honor in abito paonazzo; Chamberlains of Honor extra Urbem; Secret Chaplains and Secret Chaplains of Honor; Secret Chaplains of Honor extra Urbem; Secret Clerics; Common Papal Chaplains; Confessor of the Pontifical Family; and Secret Steward (Scalco Segreto).

The Master of the Sacred Palace (the Pope's Dominican theologian) has been renamed Theologian of the Pontifical Household. Since 2005 the post has been held by Fr. Wojciech Giertych, a Polish Dominican. The titles of Secret Almoner and Sacristan of His Holiness were changed to Almoner of His Holiness, and Vicar General of His Holiness for Vatican City, respectively, and the responsibilities of the Secretary to Embassies and Secretary of the Wardrobe were commuted into the office of the Prelates of the Antechamber. Domestic Prelates and Secret Chamberlains Supernumerary remained part of the Papal Family, but were henceforth to be called Prelates of Honor of His Holiness and Chaplains of His Holiness, respectively. Likewise, the Secret Chamberlains of the Cape and Sword (di cappa e spada) were retained under the title Gentlemen of His Holiness, and the Bussolanti took the new name of Attachés of the Antechamber. The Camerieri Segreti Partecipanti were outright abolished, as was the title of Sub-Auditor (Subdatarius).

There was also a change in honorific ecclesiastical titles, which were reduced to three categories: Protonotaries Apostolic (de numero and supernumerary), Prelates of Honor of His Holiness, and Chaplains of His Holiness. All the other categories of Monsignori were abolished.

== See also ==
- Prefecture of the Pontifical Household
- Roman Curia
- Index of Vatican City-related articles

== Sources ==
- (in Latin) Paul VI, Motu Proprio Pontificalis Domus, 28 March 1968
- Annuario Pontificio (annual publication)
- (in French) X. Barbier de Montault, L'année liturgique a Rome, Roma 1862, p. 255
