= Assistant to the papal throne =

Abolished ecclesiastical title in the Catholic Church

Tobia Aoun named Assistant at the Pontifical Throne in 1862

The Bishops-Assistant at the Pontifical Throne were ecclesiastical titles in the Catholic Church. It designated prelates belonging to the Papal Chapel, who stood near the throne of the Pope at solemn functions. They ranked immediately below the College of Cardinals and were also Counts of the Apostolic Palace. Assistants at the Pontifical Throne, unless specifically exempted, immediately enter the Papal nobility as Counts of Rome.

Pope Paul VI ended the use of this and similar titles of nobility in 1968.

== Background ==
Prelate Assistants to the Pontifical Throne are distinguished from Prince assistants, who were members of the lay nobility. Prelate Assistants held toward the Pope much the same relation as cathedral canons do to their bishop. Bishops assistants (assistentes solio pontificio) are named by a Brief of the Secretariate of State, and in virtue of their office are members of the Pontifical Chapel (Cappella Pontificia). They assist at Solemn Mass holding the book and the bugia.

== History ==
All patriarchs and some bishops selected by the Pope, were made Assistants at the Pontifical Throne.

On 22 May 1862, during the canonization ceremony of the twenty-six Catholic martyrs of Japan, Pope Pius IX elevated all the bishops present to the rank of Assistant at the Pontifical Throne. On 8 January 1866, Ruggero Luigi Emidio Antici Mattei was named Dean of the Assistants at the Pontifical Throne after Pope Pius IX named him Latin Patriarch of Constantinople. On 17 June 1867, during the 1800th anniversary of the martyrdom of Saints Peter and Paul, Pope Pius IX elevated all the bishops present to the rank of Assistant at the Pontifical Throne.

The title has not been in use since Pope Paul VI reformed the Pontifical Household. On 28 March 1968, he issued Pontificalis Domus, which renamed the Papal Court the Papal Household and eliminated all titles of nobility.

== Notable examples ==
- Peter Joseph Hurth (1857–1935): titular archbishop of Bosra, missionary bishop in East Bengal (now Bangladesh) and Vigan (Philippines). Elevated to the rank of Assistant to the papal throne and papal count in 1926.

== See also ==
- Prince Assistants to the Papal Throne
