= Francis Augustus MacNutt =

American diplomat and Catholic writer

Papal Marquis Francis Augustus MacNutt (February 15, 1863 – December 30, 1927) was an Indiana-born Catholic writer, and American diplomat, who later became a high ranking Vatican official.

== Biography ==
Francis Augustus MacNutt was also for some time an American diplomat and a prolific writer of plays and histories. MacNutt married Margaret Ogden, granddaughter of Clement Clarke Moore who wrote the famous Christmas poem The Night Before Christmas, and they established themselves in Rome at the Palazzo Pamphilj in Piazza Navona. Their home was the center of social life for the Roman nobility and senior Catholic Church officials. Today, it is the Embassy of Brazil.

MacNutt was highly influential in Vatican circles and was a close friend to three popes, Leo XIII, Pius X, and Benedict XV, and also to Cardinals Rafael Merry del Val and Mariano Rampolla, both Cardinal Secretaries of State. His influence was also known in the Austrian Imperial Court, where he established close ties with the imperial family including Empress Zita. He was offered Austrian nobility as a baron but quietly refused the distinction. At the Vatican, he worked to find solutions to the "Roman Question" which kept the Vatican and the Kingdom of Italy apart following Italy's seizure of the Papal States in 1870.

In 1903 MacNutt bought a small castle for himself and his wife, "Schloss Ratzotz" as a summer home at Bressanone/Brixen in what is today northern Italy.

MacNutt's 1912 translation from the Latin of Peter Martyr's De Orbe Novo (1530) was an important work of scholarship that modernized, moderated and improved on its only other translation into English, that of Richard Eden from 1555.

In 1926, the year before his death, he wrote his autobiography, a two volume privately printed text, which was later edited by Father John Donovan and published in 1936 as A Papal Chamberlain: The Personal Chronicle of Francis Augustus MacNutt. The preface was written by G.K. Chesterton and the foreword by Patrick Joseph Cardinal Hayes, Archbishop of New York. It was published by Longmans, Green and Co.

He died of cancer on December 30, 1927, at Schloss Ratzötz, two years before the Vatican and the Italian Kingdom established diplomatic relations which saw the establishment of the Vatican as an independent sovereign state based on much of his ideas and work. He was buried in the graveyard of Santa Maria am Sand in Millan near Bressanone in the largely German-speaking province of South Tyrol, Italy. His headstone makes no mention of his Papal titles or accomplishments. He was buried in the habit of a Third Order Lay Franciscan.

== Bibliography ==
=== Autobiography ===
A Papal Chamberlain: The Personal Chronicle of Francis Augustus MacNutt (1936), featuring a preface by G. K. Chesterton.

=== Biographies ===
Bartholomew De Las Casas: His Life, His Apostolate, and His Writings (1909)

Fernando Cortes and the Conquest of Mexico, 1485–1547 (1909)

Fernando Cortes: His Five Letters of Relation to the Emperor Charles V, 1519–1526 (1908)

=== Plays ===
Three Plays: Balboa, Xilona, The Victorious Duchess (1916)

=== Translation ===
Martyr D'Anghera, Peter. De Orbo Novo: The Eight Decades. Trans., notes & introduction by Francis Augustus MacNutt. New York: Putnam's Sons. 1912. Two volumes.

== Distinctions ==
The Marquis MacNutt was a Knight of St Gregory the Great, a senior Papal honour, and a Papal Chamberlain to Popes Leo XIII and Pius X, the only American so appointed at the time.
