= Antonio Altoviti =

Italian Catholic archbishop

Most Reverend Antonio Altoviti
- Archbishop of Florence
- Church: Catholic Church
- In office: 1548–1573
- Predecessor: Niccolò Ridolfi
- Successor: Alessandro Ottaviano de' Medici
- Previous post: Dean of the Apostolic Chamber

Personal details
- Born: 1521 Florence, Republic of Florence
- Died: 28 December 1573 (age 52) Florence, Grand Duchy of Tuscany

Antonio Altoviti (Florence, 1521 — Florence, 28 December 1573) was an Italian Catholic archbishop, son of Bindo Altoviti and archbishop of Florence from 1548 to 1573.

== Life ==
Antonio Altoviti was the son of Bindo Altoviti and Fiammetta Soderini. His father was one of the most influential bankers and patron of the arts of the Renaissance. His grandmother Dianora Altoviti was known as La Papessa on account of the influences she had held over her uncle, Pope Innocent VIII. In Rome the Altoviti and Cybo were since the times of Cosimo de' Medici Il Vecchio allies of the Medici. Bindo Altoviti's career flourished under the pontificate of Leo X and Clement VII.

Of versatile genius, Antonio was initiated to the ecclesiastical career, under the protection of one of the most authoritative Florentine prelates of the early sixteenth century, Cardinal Niccolò Ridolfi. Later he became the dean of the Apostolic Chamber and secretary of Paul III.

After the death of Clement VII and duke Alessandro de' Medici, the Altoviti sided with Catherine de' Medici and Pope Paul III, getting into an open confrontation with Cosimo I de' Medici. In 1548, as a poke in the eye to Cosimo, Pope Paul III appointed Bindo's son, Antonio Altoviti, as Archbishop of Florence. Furious by this open affront, Cosimo I. retaliated by banning the new archbishop from setting foot in the city and even seized all the income and assets of the diocese.

The next twenty years he spend most of the time in Rome where he explicated considerable activity during the famine of Rome in 1559, along with his friend and ally Cardinal Guido Ascanio Sforza di Santa Fiora. He also took part in the Council of Trent and lived for a period in Loreto, where he built a chapel dedicated to St. Elizabeth. Because of his young age and to secure power of the Altoviti in Florence he was not appointed cardinal.

After the death of Paul III (1549) Cosimo I. lost no time in asking his successors to deliver the rebellious archbishop to him, but all refused. Nevertheless, within the next years Cosimo I. manifested a policy of rapprochement with the popes in anticipation of his request to obtain the title of Grand Duke. In 1564 Pope Pius IV, Giovanni Angelo de' Medici, asked Cosimo I. to enforce the decree of the Council of Trent. Cosimo I. responded to the plea by granting forgiveness to the Altoviti and writing to Antonio Altoviti urging him to return to Florence to take command of his diocese and begin a process of reformation.

Antonio Altoviti finally took possession of the archdiocese in 1567. He entered the Florence with so much pomp, solemnity and court of nobles, that Cosimo I. was so irritated, understanding this triumphal event as a humiliation of his sovereign authority, but ordinated in the same year his nephew Alessandro Ottaviano de' Medici, to whom Antonio Altoviti a mentor, succeeded him as archbishop and became Pope Leo XI. The friendship between Antonio Altoviti and Alessandro Ottaviano de' Medici, continued the reconciliation between the House of Altoviti and the new ducal branch of the House of Medici. In 1569, Pius V finally conferred the title of grand duke of Tuscany on Cosimo I.

Antonio Altoviti was a prelate recognized for his moral integrity and his spiritual and cultural interests. In his pastoral role, he chose a coat of arms depicting a dog guarding a flock, accompanied by the motto non dormit qui vigilat ("he who watches does not sleep").

In 1573, he called a provincial synod but suddenly died on 28 December the same year, fifty-two years old. He was buried in a monument behind the church of the Santi Apostoli in Florence, under the patronage of his family, in a funeral monument by Giovanni Antonio Dosio and Giovanni Caccini.
