= Chaplain of His Holiness =

Ecclesiastical title in the Roman Catholic Church

Generic coat of arms of a Chaplain of His Holiness

Chaplain of His Holiness is a title of distinction given by the Pope in recognition of a priest's service to the Church. They are addressed with the honorific of "Monsignor" and have certain privileges with respect to ecclesiastical dress and vestments.

== History ==
The role of "Chaplain of His Holiness" dates to the 17th century when Pope Urban VIII instituted the role as an official function of the papal household. Such Chaplains have provided unpaid service since the pontificate of Pope Pius VI.

The nomination of candidates extra urbem may be granted at the request of their bishop through the Apostolic Nunciature, subject to the examination of the merits of the person considered for this rank and to the criteria of the Holy See. Once the candidate has passed all the requirements, a rescript is drawn up by the Secretariat of State attesting to their promotion to this ecclesiastical rank.

Pope Paul VI's motu proprio Pontificalis Domus of 28 March 1968, divided the Papal Household into two entities: the Chapel (Cappella Pontificia) and the Family (Familia Pontificia). The Cappella assists the pope in his functions as the spiritual head of the church, especially in religious ceremonies; the Familia assists him as a head of state. "Chaplains of His Holiness" are members of the Familia.

Those priests who had been called "Supernumerary Privy Chamberlains" continued to be part of the Papal Household, under the name of Chaplains of His Holiness. Lower ranks of Privy Chamberlains (Honorary Chamberlains of Purple Robes, Chamberlains extra Urbem, Honorary Privy Chaplains, and Honorary Chaplains extra Urbem) were abolished, making Chaplain of His Holiness the first (lowest) of the three ranks of Monsignor. A Chaplain to His Holiness wears a black cassock with fuchsia piping and buttons along with a fuchsia sash.

The following are chaplains of His Holiness as long as they are in office:

- The canons of the cathedrals of Lodi and Syracuse,
- The canons of the chapter of Saints Celse and Julian in Rome,
- The magistral chaplains of the Sovereign Order of Malta, SMOM,
- The clerics of the papal chapel,
- The canonical coadjutors of the great papal basilicas.

In 1969, the custom of Chaplains of His Holiness surrendering the title upon the death and burial of the conferring pontiff was suppressed. Today, all monsignors retain their titles upon the death and burial of a Pope.

Under new rules set by Pope Francis, fewer diocesan priests are named monsignor than in the past, and only those 65 years or older may be named.

== See also ==
- Honorary prelate
- Protonotary apostolic
