= Prelate of Honour of His Holiness =

Title of honour granted by the Pope

Generic coat of arms of an Honorary Prelate

A Prelate of Honour of His Holiness is a Catholic prelate to whom the Pope has granted this title of honour.

They are addressed as Monsignor (typically abbreviated 'Msgr') and have certain privileges as regards clerical clothing.

== Overview ==
Before the motu proprio Pontificalis Domus of 28 March 1968, Honorary Prelates (HP) were called Domestic Prelates (Latin: Antistites Urbani). Those who held certain offices were also granted the title, such as an Archbishops- or Bishops-Assistant at the Pontifical Throne, or members of the Roman Prelature. The title was retained by archbishops, bishops and protonotaries apostolic who had been awarded it before their appointment to their higher episcopal or curial role.

The Prelates of Honor are entitled to the appellation "Reverend Monsignor". Historically associated with the chamberlain of the papal court, it is the second rank of monsignor: above Chaplain to His Holiness, but below Protonotary Apostolic.

Prelates of Honor durante munere are:

- Canons of the cathedrals of Pisa, Siena and Vercelli
- Canons of the Metropolitan Chapters of Genoa, Taranto, and Bologna
- Dignity of the Metropolitan Chapter of Catania
- Senior of the Canons of San Lorenzo in Damaso in Rome
- Conventual Chaplains ad honorem of the Sovereign Military Order of Malta
- Chaplains of the Royal Chapel of the Treasure of San Gennaro in Naples
- Judges of the Tribunal of the Rota of the Apostolic Nunciature to Spain
- Superior and Dean of the Collegiate Church of Prabuty (Poland)
- Provost of Canzo (Archdiocese of Milan), 5 years after taking office
- Provost of Asso (Archdiocese of Milan)
- parish priests of the Diocese of Rome
- Provost pro tempore of Clusone (Bergamo)
- Members of the Colleges of the Tribunal of the Apostolic Penitentiary, retaining their proper habit, or the Minor Apostolic Penitentiaries
- pro tempore parish priest of Caravaggio (Bergamo).
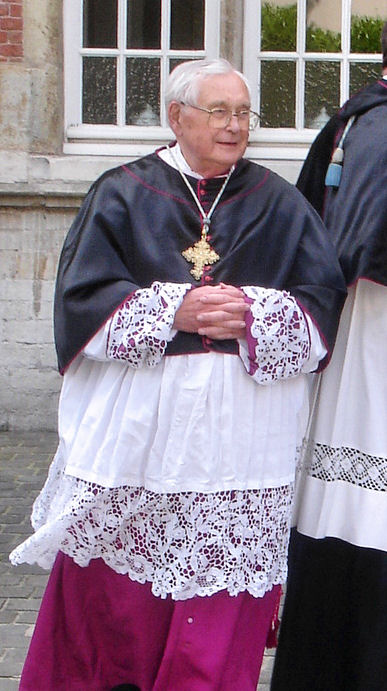
Mgr. Alfred Vanneste, Honorary Prelate

== See also ==
- Chaplain of His Holiness
- Protonotary apostolic
