= Armorial des comtes romains =

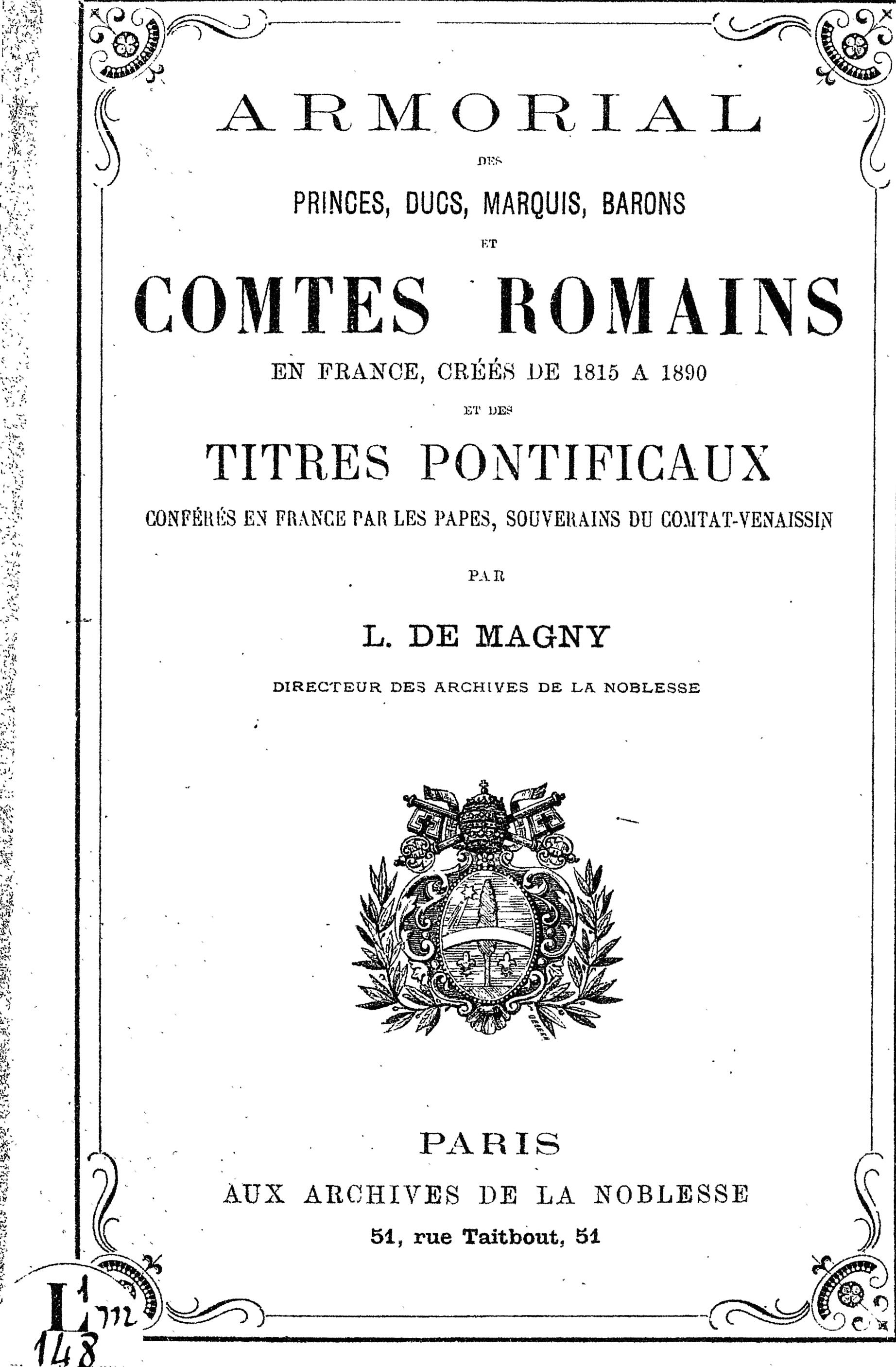
- Author: Louis de Magny
- Language: French
- Subject: Counts of France
- Genre: History
- Publisher: Archives de la Noblesse
- Publication date: 1890
- Publication place: France
- OCLC: 457866676

Armorial des comtes romains (French pronunciation: [aʁmɔʁjal de kɔ̃t ʁɔmɛ̃]) is an 1890 book about papal counts in France from 1815 to 1890, authored by Viscount Louis de Magny.

== See also ==
- Books in France
- Catholic Church in France
- French literature
