= Prince assistant to the papal throne =

Title of nobility in the Catholic Church

The Prince Assistant to the Papal Throne (Lat. Stator proximus a Solio Pontificis maximi) was a hereditary title of nobility available in the Papal Court from the early 16th century until the reforms of Pontificalis Domus by Pope Paul VI in 1968, when the Papal Court was reformed into the current Papal Household. The title is not currently in use, though it has not been formally suppressed.

== Privileges ==
During the period of the Papal Court, the Prince Assistants were the highest ranking honor available to a layman within the court. They were parallel to the Prelate Assistants to the Papal Throne. The Prince Assistant was always conspicuous in his position next to the papal chair on great solemnities.

It could be granted by hereditary right, as it was to the heads of two of the famous Roman families of papal nobility, the Orsini and the Colonna. It could also be granted ad personam, to individuals without hereditary effect.

"The Assistants to the Throne offer their services to the Prefect of the Apostolic Palace; it is their duty to do the honors of the house on the occasion of the most solemn civil ceremonies, mentioned in n. 4 § 3, and to collaborate in the smooth running of the service of the Pontifical Lay Family." Those civil ceremonies include official audiences (granted to Sovereigns, Heads of State, Prime Ministers and Ministers of Foreign Affairs: presentation of credentials by Ambassadors and Ministers accredited to the Holy See) and unofficial audiences.

Writer Grace Greenwood describes observing a prince assistant bearing a wreath of palms during a Palm Sunday service in St. Peter's. During canonization ceremonies, a special candle, painted with the likeness of the new saint and often scenes from their life, was presented by the Postulator of the Cause to the Prince Assistant. Another was presented to the pope, and a third to the Cardinal Prefect for the Congregation of the Causes for Saints.

In other words, the Assistants to the Papal Throne are the senior-most of the Gentlemen of His Holiness. Assistants to the Papal Throne, whether Prince or Prelate, were given seats of the highest precedence during papal ceremonies or liturgies, ceremonially ranking just below the College of Cardinals.

== History ==
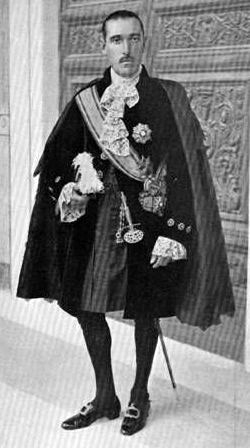
Marcantonio Colonna in ceremonial dress

The office is believed to have been instituted by Pope Julius II in 1511. Various branches of the Colonna family held the title. The Orsini family held the title from 1735 to 1958.

Since the 16th century, there have been numerous disputes and judicial controversies between the heads of the two traditionally hostile families, in order to assert their right of precedence over each other, deriving from a long series of privileges obtained over the centuries by their respective families, as evidenced by numerous memoirs and decrees, thanks to the changing favor of the popes for one family or the other, so much so that in order to overcome the sometimes heated controversies on precedence, which had been going on at least since the pontificate of Clement XI, Pope Benedict XIII established that the title of Prince assistant to the papal throne should alternate between the two heads of families.

In January 1958, Pius XII relieved Filippo Orsini of the title after his extramarital affair with English actress Belinda Lee was made public.

In 1962, Pope John XXIII appointed Alessandro Torlonia as the new Prince assistant, as he wanted a complement of two to serve as Custodians of the Second Vatican Council. Torlonia had previously served as the lay advisor to the Pontifical Commission for Vatican City State.

In 1968, as part of the ongoing reception and implementation of the Second Vatican Council, Pope Paul VI issued an Apostolic Letter motu proprio which reformed the Papal Court into the Papal Household, consisting of two sections, the clerical Papal Chapel, and the lay Papal Family. Nearly all titles of nobility and many of the other Renaissance titles were suppressed.

During those reforms, the Prince Assistants ceased to be a hereditary title, and the two living Prince Assistants, Aspreno Colonna and Alessandro Torlonia were allowed to retain the title personally until their deaths. Colonna died in 1987, and Torlonia died in 2017.

The title is not currently in use.

== See also ==
- Prelate Assistants to the Pontifical Throne
- Papal nobility
- Papal household
- Black Nobility
- Noble Guard
