= Hereditary officers of the Roman Curia =

The Roman Court or Papal Curia was reformed by the papal bull Pontificalis Domus issues by Pope Paul VI in 1969. It abolished the role of the old Roman nobility at the papal court with the exception of the position of Prince Assistant to the Papal Throne. The titles abolished, such as the Grand Master of the Sacred Apostolic Hospice and Marshal of the Holy Roman Church and the Sacred Conclave, remain heredity but are now purely honorary.

This position of Prince Assistant had been shared jointly by the Princes Orsini and Colonna, but the former was deprived of the title by Pope Pius XII after he obtained a divorce and the title was conferred upon Prince Torlonia, Prince of Fucino, Canino and Musignano of the Torlonia family.

The Prince Assistants are representatives of the Roman nobility, who serve at the feet of the Throne immediately next to the cardinal deacon who stands to the right of the pope. They alternate in fulfilling the functions of the office and no one can substitute for them. Their principal function is to serve on the occasion of official visits by a head of state.

The reforms of 1969 also abolished the various categories of Secret Chamberlains of the Cape and Sword and changed this title to Gentlemen of His Holiness. Other offices were abolished altogether, but officeholders were reassigned.

== Office holders ==
=== Great officers ===
- Prince Assistants to the Papal Throne (hereditary):
  - Prince Don Alessandro Torlonia, Prince of Fucino, Canino and Musignano
  - Prince Don Aspreno Colonna, Prince and Duke of Paliano
- Marshal of the Holy Roman Church and the Sacred Conclave (hereditary):
  - Prince Don Sigismondo Chigi-Albani della Rovere, Prince of the Holy Roman Empire, Prince of Farnese, Campagnano, and Soriano, Duke of Ariccia and Formello
- Grand Master of the Sacred Apostolic Hospice (hereditary):
  - Prince Don Alessandro Ruspoli
- Hereditary Quartermaster General of the Sacred Apostolic Palace (hereditary):
  - Marquess Giulio Sacchetti, Marquess of Castel Romano (highest ranking laymen in the Vatican service as Delegate of the State of the City of the Vatican)
- Cavallerizzo Maggiore (Superintendent of the stables of the Palaces) (hereditary):
  - Marquess Gregorio Serlupi Crescenzi
- Superintendent of the Posts (hereditary):
  - Prince Don Leone Massimo, Prince and Lord of Arsoli, Duke of Anticoli Corrado
- Keeper of the Golden Rose (destined for members of royal houses) (non-hereditary)

=== Papal guards ===
- Captain Commander of the Noble Guard (not hereditary, but always a Roman prince with the rank of Lieutenant General):
  - last holders included Princes Altieri, Aldobrandini, Barberini, Rospigliosi).
- Standard Bearer of the Holy Roman Church (hereditary, with the rank of Lieutenant-General)
  - Marquess Patrizio Patrizi Naro Montoro, Marquess of the Baldacchino
- Commandant of the Palatine Guard (non-hereditary)
- Captain Commander of the Swiss Guard (not hereditary, but always a Swiss man):
  - Christoph Graf

== See also ==
- Prefecture of the Pontifical Household
