= Pontificalis Domus =

Motu proprio issued by Pope Paul VI

The papal arms of Pope Paul VI

Pontificalis Domus (English: The Papal Household) was a motu proprio document issued by Pope Paul VI on 28 March 1968, in the fifth year of his pontificate. It reorganized the Papal Household, which had been known until then as the Papal Court.

== Contents ==
=== Introduction ===
The motu proprio reflects Paul VI's personal discomfort with pageantry and a desire to reshape the Church in a more pastoral mode. His rationale for reorganizing the Papal Household was that many of the offices entrusted to members of the Papal Household continued to exist as purely honorary positions, after their functions had become obsolete. His goal in reorganizing its structure will be to stress the "essentially spiritual" mission of the Pope, as well to serve the civic and international aspects of the Pope's office.

He thus divides the Papal Household into two entities: the chapel (Capella) and the Family (Familia): the Papal Chapel will assist the Pope with his role as spiritual leader of the Catholic religion, while the Family will serve the Pope insofar as he is a publicly recognized sovereign.

To conclude the introduction, Paul VI reinstates the "original and noble" name of the Papal Court: the Papal Household (primigenio et illustri vocabulo Pontificalis Domus tantummodo appellabitur).

=== Section I: The Papal Household ===
The first section deals with the overarching structure of the Papal Household. It states that the Papal Household shall be composed of both clergy and laity (1, §1). All members of the Papal Household are subject to the direction of the Prefect of the Apostolic Palace (2), but they are all, both ecclesiastical and lay, appointed by the Supreme Pontiff (3, §1). The tenure of all members of the Papal Chapel is subject to the norms established in the 1967 apostolic constitution Regimini Universae ecclesiae, which reformed the Roman Curia; laity are appointed for a period of five years, but the Pope may extend their term of office (3, §2). All offices will be voided upon the vacancy of the Apostolic See, and no offices are hereditary (3, §3 and §4). Furthermore, all ceremonies of the Papal Household will be categorized as either sacred or civil (sacrae aut civiles); the sacred ceremonies are either solemn or ordinary. (Examples of solemn ceremonies include the coronation of a pope, canonizations, etc.) The civil ceremonies are distinguished as either audiences of official character or of a non-official character (4).

=== Section II: The Papal Chapel ===
The second section deals with the organization of the Papal Chapel, which consists of the following classes of persons (6, §1):

- the ecclesiastical members of the Papal Family;
- members of various orders of the Sacred College of Cardinals;
- patriarchs, archbishops, bishops, and eparchs, Assistants to the Papal Throne, of both the Latin and Eastern rites;
- Vice Camerlengo of Holy Roman Church;
- the superior prelate of each of the Sacred Congregations, the Secretary of the Supreme Tribunal of the Signatura, and the Dean of the Sacred Roman Rota;
- Regent of the Sacred Apostolic Penitentiary;
- Regent of the Apostolic Chancery;
- superior prelate of the three Secretariats;
- President of the Pontifical Council for Social Communications;
- the Abbot of Monte Cassino and the Abbots General of Canons Regular and Monastic Orders;
- the Superior General or, in his absence, the Procurator General of each of the Mendicant Orders;
- Auditors of the Tribunal of the Roman Rota;
- voting members of the Supreme Tribunal of the Apostolic Signatura;
- members of the chapters of the three patriarchal basilicas (Lateran, Vatican and Liberian);
- Consistorial Advocates (Avvocati Concistoriali);
- parish priests of Rome;
- clerics of the Papal Chapel;
- members of the Council of the Laity and of the Commission Iustitia et Pax;
- those in personal service (familiari) of the Pope.

The following offices were abolished or altered: Palatine Cardinals (Cardinali Palatini); prelates di fiocchetto; Prince-Assistants to the Throne (Principi assistenti al Soglio); the Interior Minister; Commander of Santo Spirito; Roman Magistrate; Master of the Sacred Apostolic Hospice; Chamberlains of Honor in abito paonazzo; Secret Chaplains and Secret Chaplains of Honor; Secret Clerics; Confessor of the Pontifical Family; Candle-Carrying Acolytes (Ceroferari); Common Papal Chaplains; Porter-Masters of the Virga Rubea; Guardian of the Sacred Tiara; Mace-Bearer; and Apostolic Messenger (Cursori Apostolici) (6, §4).

The last point of this section defines the role of clerics of the Papal Chapel, who are to assist the Pope at the altar, under the guidance of the papal masters of ceremonies. The suppressed offices of Secret Chaplain and Secret Chaplain of Honor, Secret Cleric, Acolyte Ceroferari, Common Papal Chaplain, and Porter-Masters of the Virga Rubea are to be joined under the general heading of "Cleric of the Papal Chapel" (6, §5).

=== Section III: The Papal Family ===
The third and last section of the document deals with the Papal Family. The Family is composed of both ecclesiastical and lay members. The ecclesiastical members are as follows (7, §1):

- Substitute of the Secretariat of State and Secretary della Cifra
- Secretary of the Council for the Public Affairs of the Church;
- Almoner of His Holiness;
- Vicar General of His Holiness for Vatican City;
- President of the Pontifical Ecclesiastical Academy;
- Theologian of the Papal Household;
- Secretary of Briefs to Princes;
- Secretary of Latin Letters;
- Protonotaries Apostolic;
- Prelates of the Antechamber;
- Masters of Pontifical Ceremonies;
- Honorary Prelates of His Holiness;
- Chaplains of His Holiness;
- Apostolic Preacher.

The lay members of the Papal Family are composed of the following (7, §2):

- Prince Assistants to the Papal Throne;
- Delegate of the Pontifical Commission for Vatican City State;
- Counsellor General of the State of Vatican City;
- Commander of the Honor Guard of the Pope;
- Commander of the Swiss Guard;
- Commander of the Palatine Guard of Honor;
- Commander of the Pontifical Gendarmerie;
- Counsellors of the State of Vatican City;
- President of the Pontifical Academy of Sciences;
- Gentlemen of His Holiness;
- Procurators of the Apostolic Palaces;
- Attachés of the Antechamber (Addetti di Anticamera);
- those in personal service (familiari) of the Pope.

Section three goes on to abolish the following offices and positions: Palatine Cardinals (Cardinali Palatini); the Palatine prelates (i.e., Auditor of His Holiness); Master of the Sacred Apostolic Hospice; the Hereditary Quartermaster General of the Sacred Apostolic Palace (Foriere Maggiore); Master of the Horse to His Holiness (Cavallerizzo Maggiore di Sua Santità); General Superintendent of Posts; the Keepers of the Golden Rose; Secretary to Embassies; Esente of the Noble Guard of Service; Chamberlains of Honor in abito paonazzo; Chamberlains of Honor extra Urbem; Secret Chaplains and Secret Chaplains of Honor; Secret Chaplains of Honor extra Urbem; Secret Clerics; Common Papal Chaplains; Confessor of the Pontifical Family; and Secret Steward (Scalco Segreto) (7, §3).

The titles Majordomo of His Holiness and Master of the Chamber [Maestro di Camera] were abolished with the duties combined in the new Prefect of the Apostolic Palace (later re-named Prefect of the Papal Household).

The Master of the Sacred Apostolic Palace is to retain his office but under the name of Theologian of the Papal Household (7, §4). The title of Secret Chamberlains Partecipanti (Camerieri Segreti Partecipanti) is abolished; the Secret Almoner and the Sacristan of His Holiness remain in office, but they take respectively the titles of Almoner of His Holiness, and Vicar General of His Holiness for Vatican City. The Secretary of Briefs to Princes and the Secretary of Latin Letters retain their titles. The responsibilities of the Secretary to Embassies and Secretary of the Wardrobe are commuted to the office of the Prelates of the Antechamber. The title of Sub-Auditor (Subdatarius) remains abolished in both name and office (7, §5). Domestic Prelates and Secret Chamberlains Supernumerary remain part of the Papal Family, but are henceforth to be called Prelates of Honor of His Holiness and Chaplains of His Holiness, respectively. Likewise, the Secret Chamberlains of the Cape and Sword (di cappa e spada) are to be retained under the title Gentlemen of His Holiness, and the Bussolanti take the new name of Attachés of the Antechamber (7, §7).

The many offices of honorific ecclesiastical titles—i.e., those given to clerics styled Monsignori—are reduced to three categories: Protonotaries Apostolic (de numero and supernumerary), Prelates of Honor of His Holiness, and Chaplains of His Holiness. All the other categories were abolished (8).

The Corps of the Noble Pontifical Guard assumed the name Honor Guard of the Pope (Guardia d'Onore del Papa), and rendered only an honorary service (9). The Swiss Guard, the Palatine Guard, and the Pontifical Gendarmerie remained in service (10). (Note: Some sources will say that the Palatine Guard or the Gendarmes were disbanded by the motu proprio, but in fact it was a letter from Paul VI to his Secretary of State on 14 September 1970 which disbanded all the papal armed forces except the Swiss Guard.)

== Notes and references ==
Notes

== See also ==
- Pope Paul VI
- Aggiornamento
- Pope Paul VI's reform of the Roman Curia
- Hereditary officers of the Roman Curia
- Pastor Bonus (Pope John Paul II's apostolic constitution further reforming the Roman Curia)
