= Cursores apostolici =

Cursores apostolici was the Latin title of the ecclesiastical heralds of the papal court. The office was abolished in 1968 with the motu proprio Pontificalis Domus.

== History ==
Cursores is the plural of the Latin Cursor, meaning "runner". In the early ages of the Church, an institution somewhat similar to that of the cursores is found in messengers, chosen from among the clergy, to carry important tidings from one bishop to another or from the bishop to his flock.

The origin of the Cursores Apostolici is placed in the twelfth century, and they fulfilled for the pontifical government the duties entrusted to heralds by civil states. They carried a silver mace (mazza), like the mazzieri.

From the sixteenth century onward they formed part of the Roman Curia in its broader sense, and are reckoned members of the pontifical family. Their number was fixed at seven, headed by the magister cursor.

The principal duties of the cursores were to invite those who are to take part in consistories and functions in the papal chapel; to act as servitors in the pontifical palace and as doorkeepers of the conclave; to affix papal rescripts to the doors of the greater Roman basilicas.

They also issued the summons for attendance at consistories, canonizations, the funerals of cardinals etc. As representatives of the pope, the cursores must be received with the respect becoming the personage in whose name they speak, and their invitation has the force of a judicial summons.

For the consistory of January 1953, the Cursores apostolici formally notified the cardinals present in Rome. (The date was already known through unofficial Curia channels.) Afterwards, the black-clad cursores apostolici, accompanied by two Noble Guards each, hurried to the quarters of the seventeen new cardinals present in Rome to bring them the certificate of appointment written on parchment, signed by the Dean of the Sacred College and sealed by the Apostolic Chancery. The majority of the foreign candidates had taken up residence in the various Roman Colleges.

In the Middle Ages, candidates for a license at university were called cursores.

== See also ==
- Apparitors
