= Papal nobility =

Nobility of the Holy See

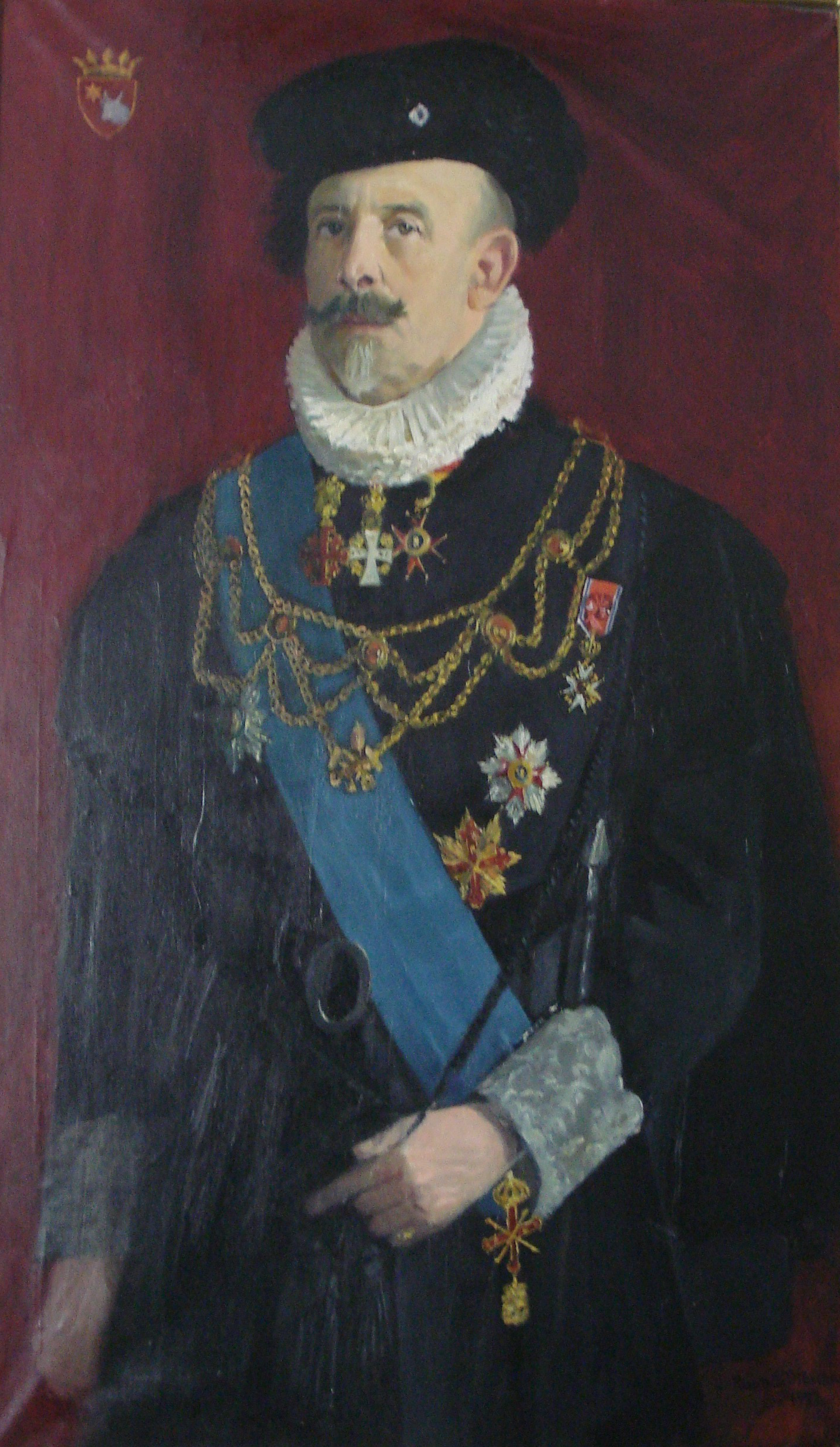
Christopher, Count de Paus (1862–1943), in the court dress of a papal chamberlain. A Norwegian convert to Catholicism, he was appointed a papal chamberlain by Benedict XV in 1921 and created a count by Pius XI in 1923.

The papal nobility are the aristocracy of the Holy See, composed of persons holding titles bestowed by the Pope in his capacity as the head of state of Vatican City (rather than his positions within the Roman Catholic Church). From the Middle Ages into the nineteenth century, the papacy held direct temporal power in the Papal States, and many titles of papal nobility were derived from fiefs with territorial privileges attached. During this time, the Pope also bestowed ancient civic titles such as patrician. Today, the Pope still exercises authority to grant titles with territorial designations, although these are purely nominal and the privileges enjoyed by the holders pertain to styles of address and heraldry. Additionally, the Pope grants personal and familial titles that carry no territorial designation. Their titles being merely honorific, the modern papal nobility includes descendants of ancient Roman families as well as notable Catholics from many countries. All pontifical noble titles are within the personal gift of the pontiff, and are not recorded in the Official Acts of the Holy See.

== Background ==
The Roman heritage of the papacy accounts for many of its traditions regarding ranks of nobility. As temporal ruler of the city of Rome, the Pope awarded civic titles of classical origin such as Patrician and Summus Senator. The Roman title of Dux originally applied to a military leader. During the Byzantine period, it came to refer to the military governor of a certain district appointed by the Exarch. The Duchies of Rome, Perugia and Pentapolis were established in this context. In 751 the Exarchate of Ravenna fell to the Lombards. Five years later, Pepin the Short, King of the Franks, defeated the Lombards and granted the lands of the Duchy of Rome to the Papacy.

The Lombard Duchies of Spoleto and Benevento existed within the future lands of the Papal States. Under the Carolingian empire, the County (also derived from a Roman precedent; Comes, Comitatus), was instituted as the basic jurisdictional unit centered on a fortified town or castle. The march or mark, ruled by a marquis (or "march count") was a border territory with defensive significance. The status of Count Palatine also emerged for high officers of the Imperial household. Key to the military organization of the Lombards and Franks was the free association between the local military leader and the warrior caste - hence the Germanic origin of the title of Baron. As feudalism developed the old Byzantine, Lombard, and Frankish structures were worked into a hierarchy, and the old military and administrative offices became hereditary titles with fiefs attached.

== History ==
=== Middle Ages ===
By the year 900, Frankish power in Italy had dissipated. The Popes assumed direct control in the Patrimony of St. Peter rather than creating intermediate feudatories. However, the Roman baronial families exerted enormous control. The Counts of Tusculum held enormous influence over the papacy for a period, installing several of their own family members. Up through the Renaissance, the papacy was intermittently threatened by the violent struggle between the noble families.

The late Middle Ages were marked by a rivalry between the Guelphs and Ghibellines – the parties favoring Pope and Emperor, respectively – that roiled the cities of Northern Italy. Papal power was retained, but the Popes frequently fled Rome for the safety of Orvieto, Perugia and Viterbo. The instability of the communes gradually gave way to the stabilizing influence of the podesta or signoria. Gradually, magnates of certain powerful families (such as the Ordelaffi, the Manfredi, the Scaligeri, the Malatesta, the Da Polenta, the Bentivoglio, the d'Este, and the Da Montefeltro) began to establish hereditary lordships and expand their power to neighboring towns. During the Papal exile, Cardinal Gil de Albornoz was commissioned by Innocent VI to subdue the independent states.

=== Early modern period ===
When the Pope returned to Italy at the end of the fourteenth century, he had to either overthrow or force the submission of the lords of the cities of Emilia-Romagna, Marche and Umbria. The Medici of Florence and other noble families set their sights on the papacy as a means of aggrandizing themselves and establishing dynastic goals through marriage, diplomacy and ennoblement. Cesare Borgia notably ousted many of the lords of the Romagna and established himself as the duke of the province before being overthrown by his father's successor Julius II. Julius managed to marry his nephew, Giovanni Della Rovere, to the heiress of the Duchy of Urbino. Paul III created the Duchy of Parma out of conquered territory for the Farnese. Prominent families could purchase curial offices for their sons and regularly did, hoping that the son would rise through Church ranks to become a bishop cardinal, or even Pope, from which position they could dispense further titles and positions of authority to other family members. Bourgeois families found themselves, sometimes within only one or two generations, elevated to the Roman nobility when a relative was elected to the papal throne. Modern Italy is dotted with the fruits of their success; various family palazzi remain standing today as a testament to their sometimes meteoric rise to power.

From the second half of the 16th century onwards, members of the higher clergy and the aristocracy connected to the papal court built a number of stately homes, or suburban villas in the countryside of Lazio. The Ville Pontificie were designed by renowned architects. The Villa Farnese in Caprarola was the work of Antonio da Sangallo the Younger and Baldassare Peruzzi. The homes were often decorated by noted artists. Taddeo Zuccari was commissioned to paint the Histories of Alexander for the Castello Orsini at Bracciano.

As modern statehood emerged and the boundaries between imperial and papal territory solidified, titles of nobility were proliferated as a means of establishing allies and friendly buffer states. The Holy Roman Emperor elevated the Duchies of Milan, Florence, Mantua, and Modena, and the pope likewise elevated the Duchies of Urbino, Ferrara and Parma. From the late sixteenth century onward, with the papal territory relatively secure, noble families were enriched with the title of prince, their counties and marquisates were elevated to duchies, and the Medici were even made grand dukes of Tuscany by Pius V. Likewise, papal orders of knighthood and personal titles, sometimes attached to positions of honor in the papal household, came into greater use.

=== 1800–1870 ===
The Napoleonic occupation of Rome led to the temporary abolition of noble titles. Upon restitution of sovereignty to the Papal States, Pius VII decided to abolish feudalism, transforming all the titles to honorifics disconnected from territorial privileges. In 1853, Pius IX put an end to the centuries-old duality between the papal nobility and the Roman baronial families by equating the civic patrichiate of the city of Rome with the nobility created by the Pope. In 1854 a complete list of Roman princely families was drawn up and entered into the Golden Book of the Capitoline nobility (established by the Urbem Romam constitution of Benedict XIV of 1746). Both the civic nobles and the papal aristocracy thus obtained the title of Patrician.

=== 1870–1946 ===
After the Kingdom of Italy annexed the Papal States and captured Rome in 1870, the new kingdom recognized the existing nobility in its new territory. The pope remained a self-described "prisoner in the Vatican", supported by the so-called "black nobility" of families who remained loyal to the papacy rather than the Italian monarchy. The Lateran Treaty ended this dispute.

Pope Leo XIII ennobled French and American philanthropist Joseph Florimond Loubat as the Duc de Loubat. In 1902 he made Pennsylvania businessman Martin Maloney a papal marquis, and two years later a member of the papal court as a Chamberlain of the Sword and Cape. Among Maloney's various charitable activities was a home for the elderly in honor of his parents, donations to the Catholic University of America, and towards the refurbishment of the Lateran Basilica. In 1903, Leo created New York City socialite and benefactress Annie Leary a Papal Countess, the first such title to have been bestowed upon a woman in the United States. Pope Pius X named New York City builder John D. Crimmons a Knight of the Order of St. Gregory the Great. A trustee of St. Patrick's Cathedral, Crimmons established Corpus Christi Monastery at Hunts Point in the Bronx for the Dominican Sisters of Perpetual Adoration.

On the occasion of the signing of the Lateran Accords of 1929, the Italian government recognized the sovereignty of the Holy See and confirmed the pope's power to grant noble titles. It also recognized the titles granted by the pope until that date and all future titles as equivalent to the noble titles of the Kingdom of Italy. This rule remained in force until the 1946 abolition of the Italian monarchy. In 1969 the Italian Council of State determined that the provision of the Lateran Treaty concerning the recognition of papal titles that was incorporated into the Italian Constitution was still valid and therefore that their use in Italy was still licit. No provision, however, has been made for their use in Italian passports, identity cards or civil state registries.

=== Since 1946 ===
Few Pontifical titles, other than personal nobility obtained by individual appointment into the several Pontifical equestrian orders, have been granted since the election of Pope John XXIII in 1958. In 1968, Paul VI reformed the papal court via the apostolic letter Pontificalis Domus, which reorganized the court into the Pontifical Household. At this time he also declared that the papal nobility would no longer be a constituent body in the Pontifical Household.

Although the custom of conferring noble titles such as prince, duke, marquis, count, viscount, baron, lord, knight, noble and patrician has since essentially disappeared, Pope John Paul II ennobled several distinguished individuals during his pontificate, as did Pope Benedict XVI, through the Vatican Secretariat of State. John Paul II granted several noble titles to Polish compatriots at the beginning of his pontificate, but quietly and without their being published in the Acts of the Apostolic See.

The popes continue to award knighthoods and other honors, which do not confer titled-nobility status, with the exception of Count of the Sacred Palace of the Lateran.

== Structure ==
=== Titles ===
Historically, papal nobility has included the titles of prince, duke, marquis, count, viscount, baron, lord, knight, nobile and patrician.

At times, certain rulers paid a type of feudal homage to the papacy (Poland, 991; England, 1213). Inversely, the Pope claimed the authority to create and anoint rulers (Holy Roman Empire, 800, 962, etc.; Sicily, 1059; Crown of Aragon, 1204; Latin Empire of Constantinople, 1217; Sicily, 1265), to depose them (Holy Roman Empire, 1076, 1245; Portugal, 1247), to elevate them (Croatia, 925; Hungary, 1001; Sicily, 1130; Portugal, 1179; Tuscany, 1569), and to decide disputes between them (Corsica, 1217; Treaty of Tordesillas, 1493). The Pope also had strong claims to the feudal sovereignty of Naples-Sicily.

While some titles were traditionally linked to territorial privileges to a fief of the Papal States, others were associated only with privileges of court, notably, Prince Assistant to the Papal Throne.

Within the ecclesiastical hierarchy cardinals are referred to as princes of the Church, and are considered analogous to temporal princes within a kingdom. Historically, many popes have designated a member of their family as an official cardinal-nephew. Certain offices of the Curia and the Papal Household carry honorifics, such as the style monsignor.

Just as Catholic monarchs sometimes exercised veto powers in papal elections, bishops and abbots were historically represented in the parliaments or "estates-general" (legislative and consultative assemblies) of many countries. The archbishops of Mainz, Trier, and Cologne served as ex officio prince-electors of the Holy Roman Empire. Within the Empire, prince-primates, prince-bishops and prince-abbots often held territorial privileges.

=== Counts and countesses ===
Count/countess (Italian: conte, contessa) is one of the noble titles still granted by the pope as a mark of personal distinction without any territorial entailment. The holder is styled "Count(ess) [Surname]" and may be informally referred to as a papal count/papal countess or, more rarely, as a Roman count/Roman countess. The comital title, which can be for life or hereditary, has been awarded in various forms by popes and Holy Roman emperors since the Middle Ages, and the pope continued to grant the comital and other noble titles even after 1870, when the Papal States were taken from the pope.

Recipients of such honours included both Italians – especially those close to the papacy (some of whom were/are papal relatives) – and prominent non-Italian Catholics, including Irish tenor John McCormack, Irish art historian and politician George Noble Plunkett, American financier George MacDonald, American philanthropist Katherine E. Price, and Rose Kennedy (mother of U.S. president John F. Kennedy). American Francis Augustus MacNutt was a papal marquis, and Argentine Mercedes Castellanos de Anchorena was a papal marchioness. During the 1920s, Genevieve and Nicholas Frederic Brady of New York were granted papal dukedoms. All pontifical noble titles are within the personal gift of the pontiff, and they are not recorded in the Official Acts of the Holy See.

==== Count of the Sacred Palace of the Lateran ====
The title "Count of the Sacred Palace of the Lateran" is an honour that is granted ex officio and ad vitam to those who have been created Pontifical Chamberlains (now styled as Gentlemen of His Holiness) as attendants to the Pontifical Court. Additionally, the honour was collectively granted to the Spanish chapters of the Order of the Holy Sepulchre, the only purely noble chapters of the order. Their members enjoy several heraldic privileges in addition to the right to use the Comital title. This tradition can be traced back to the Reconquista, in which the Order played an important role. According to heraldic expert Lord Manuel de Mata, the Spanish Members of the Order are allowed to use both the full title of Count of the Sacred Palace of the Lateran as well as just the title of Count before their names. The rights were recorded in the Memorias de la Academia Mallorquina de Estudios Genealógicos and approved by King Alfonso XIII of Spain.

=== Fiefs of the State of the Church ===
From the sixteenth century forward, strong statehood developed in Italy and vague, overlapping territorial claims were gradually determined and settled through conquest and treaty. Although temporal rule in Italy was theoretically shared with the Holy Roman Emperor, the papacy held most of Lazio, Umbria, Marche, and parts of Emilia-Romagna directly from the Carolingian period to the Risorgimento by right of treaty or donation from secular rulers (Donation of Sutri, 728; Donation of Pepin, 756; Otto IV, 1201; Rudolf I, 1278). Within this territory, known as the State of the Church, the pope had authority to dispose of certain hereditary fiefs, notably:

- The Duchy of Urbino (1155, Frederick Barbarossa cr. Antonio da Montefeltro Imperial Vicar of Urbino; 1213, elevated to county by Frederick II; 1443, elevated to duchy by Eugene IV; 1508, inherited by Francesco Maria I della Rovere the son of Giovanna da Montefeltro; 1516, given to Lorenzo II de' Medici, Lord of Florence, during the War of the League of Cambrai; 1521, restored to Della Rovere; 1625–1631, willed to Papacy by Francesco Maria II)
- The Duchy of Ferrara (756, part of the Donation of Pepin; 1187, signory held by the Marquis d'Este; 1278, part of the donation of Rudolf I; 1288, Modena and Reggio gained by the d'Este; 1293, Ferrara, Modena and Reggio elevated to Marquisates; 1308–1309, succession crisis, Papacy defeats Venetian attempts to control Ferrara; 1317, d'Este restored with papal support; 1452, Emperor Frederick III elevates Modena and Reggio to Duchies; 1571, Paul II elevates Ferrara to duchy; 1598, Ferrara devolves to the Papacy, Modena and Reggio to d'Este heirs recognized by the Emperor)
- The Duchy of Parma and Piacenza (In 1512, during the War of the League of Cambrai, territories of Parma and Piacenza ceded to Julius II by the Sforza-controlled Duchy of Milan under terms of the Congress of Mantua, Este duchies of Modena and Reggio also confirmed as a papal fief; in 1516, after reverses of fortune, Parma ceded back to French-controlled Milan and claims to Modena renounced under the terms of the Congress of Bologna; in 1521, during the Four Years' War, Parma captured by Hispano-Papal forces, confirmed to the papacy in the Treaty of Rome of 1525, Milan ceded to Imperial party and Sforza re-instated; 1545, Pier Luigi Farnese is created Duke of Parma and Piacenza by Pope Paul III, his father; 1547, Pier Luigi assassinated by Ferrante Gonzaga, Imperial Governor of Milan, and Piacenza occupied by Imperial troops, Ottavio Farnese succeeds in Parma; 1549, in an attempt to ensure direct papal control against Imperial-Milanese encroachment, Ottavio dispossessed, 1550, reinstated by Julius III; in 1551, Ottavio, threatened by the ambitions of Charles V, places himself under the protection of France initiating the War of Parma; 1552, Treaty of Chambord, France distracts Imperial forces to Germany, Julius III negotiates a truce with Farnese who is tentatively restored; 1556, Charles V abdicates Milan to his son, Philip II of Spain, and Ottavio Farnese submits to his protection in the Treaty of Ghent)
- The Principality and Duchy of Paliano (Colonna)
- The Principalities of Palestrina, Valmontone, Anticoli and Roviano (Barberini), Arsoli, Roccasecca dei Volsci, Prossedi, Triggiano (Massimo), Canino and Musignano (Bonaparte), Farnese and Campagnano (Farnese), and Meldola (of the Doria-Pamphilj), Cerveteri, Parrano, Poggio Suasa
- The Lombard Duchy of Benevento (1805–1814, Napoleon elevates Benevento and Pontecorvo to Principalities)
- The Duchies of Castro and Latera (Farnese), the Duchy of Ariccia (of the Chigi), the Duchy of Bracciano, the Duchy of Fiano, the Duchy of Camerino (of the Da Varano), the Duchy of Spoleto, the Duchy of Romagna, the Duchy of Giove, the Duchy of Cerveteri, the Duchy of Monterotondo, Duchy of Nemi, Calcata, Rignano, Ferentillo
- The Counties of Tusculum, Segni, Spello and Bettona, Fondi, Vignanello, Falcino, Ronciglione
- The Marquisates (or Marches) of Ancona, Fermo, Riano, Belmonte
- The Lordships (Signories) of Perugia, Foligno, Fano, Pesaro, Rimini, Cesena, Forlì, Faenza and Imola

=== Noble houses ===
Examples of Italian noble houses of the papacy include:

Noble house	Coat of arms	Current head	Titles
House of Aldobrandini		Camillo Aldobrandini	Prince of Meldola and Sarsina
House of Altieri		Extinct in 1955	Prince of Oriolo; Prince of Viano; Prince of Racina; Duke of Monterano
House of Barberini		Francesco Barberini	Prince of Palestrina; Prince di Valmontone; Duke of Monterotondo
House of Borghese		Scipione Virginio Flavio Giacomo Antonio Maria Borghese	Prince of Sulmona, Rossano, Montecompatri, Vivaro, Sperliga e Manganelli, etc.
House of Braschi		Giovanni Angelo Theodoli-Braschi	Prince of the Holy Roman Empire; Duke of Nemi; Prince of Rocca Sinibalda; Marquis of Belmonte Sabino; Count of Falcino
House of Chigi		Mario Chigi	Prince of the Holy Roman Empire; Duke of Ariccia; Prince of Farnese; Prince of Campagnano
House of Colonna		Marcantonio Colonna (Paliano line)	Prince assistant to the Papal throne; Prince of Paliano; Prince of Stigliano; Prince of Carbognano; etc...
House of Cybo		Extinct in 1790	Prince of the Holy Roman Empire; Prince of Massa and Marquis of Carrara; Duke of Massa e Prince of Carrara; Duke and Marquis of Aiello; etc...
House of Doria-Pamphili-Landi		Extinct in 2000	Prince of Melfi; Prince of Borgotaro; Prince of Meldola; Duke of Montelanico; Marquis of Torriglia
House of Massimo		Fabrizio Massimo Arsoli	Prince of Arsoli; Prince of Roccasecca dei Volsci; Prince of Prossedi; Prince of Roviano; Prince of Triggiano; Duke of Anticoli-Corrado; Duke of Calcata; Duke of Rignano
House of Mattei		Extinct in 1801	Duke of Giove
House of Orsini		Domenico Napoleone Orsini	Prince Assistant to the Papal Throne; Prince of the Holy Roman Empire; Duke of Gravina; Duke of Amalfi; Duke of Bracciano; Count of Pitigliano
House of Ruspoli		Francesco Ruspoli	Prince of Cerveteri; Prince of Parrano; Prince of Poggio Suasa; Duke of Morignano; Marquess of Riano; Count of Vignanello

== See also ==
- Armorial des comtes romains, 1890 book about papal counts in France from 1815 to 1890
- Nobility of Italy
- Noble Guard (Vatican)
- Prince Assistants to the Papal Throne
- Papal orders of knighthood
