= Portrait of Bindo Altoviti =

Painting by Raphael

- Artist: Raphael
- Year: c. 1512–1515
- Type: oil on wood
- Dimensions: 60 cm × 44 cm (24 in × 17 in)
- Location: National Gallery of Art, Washington, D.C.

The Portrait of Bindo Altoviti is a painting finished around 1515 by the Italian High Renaissance painter Raphael. It is housed in the National Gallery of Art in Washington, D.C., United States.

Bindo Altoviti, a wealthy banker born in Rome in 1491 of Florentine descent, was a cultured man with a strong appreciation for the arts.

The subject's graceful, almost effeminate pose, combined with the pronounced contrast between light and shadow, is atypical of Raphael’s portraits of men. This painting demonstrates Raphael’s experimentation with different styles during his later period in Rome, where he was heavily influenced by Leonardo work, which he studied closely. This influence is particularly evident in this piece.

The painting remained with Altoviti's descendants until 1808, when it was sold to Ludwig I of Bavaria. It then resided at the Alte Pinakothek until 1936, when, following considerable debate over its attribution, it was removed from Nazi Germany by "canny English dealers". Acquired by Samuel Henry Kress, the portrait subsequently became property of the National Gallery of Art collection in Washington, D.C.

A bronze bust of Altoviti by Benvenuto Cellini is exhibited in Boston at the Isabella Stewart Gardner Museum.

== See also ==
- List of paintings by Raphael
