= Bindo Altoviti =

Italian banker (1491–1557)

Portrait of Bindo Altoviti by Raphael, c. 1514

Bindo Altoviti (26 November 1491 – 22 January 1557) of the Altoviti family was an Italian banker and one of the most influential papal bankers of his generation. A patron of the arts, he cultivated close friendships with artists such as Benvenuto Cellini, Raphael, Michelangelo and Giorgio Vasari.

His father was Antonio Altoviti, the papal Master of the Mint, and his mother was La Papessa Dianora Altoviti, niece of Pope Innocent VIII. One of his direct descendants was Pope Clement XII.

== Life and career ==
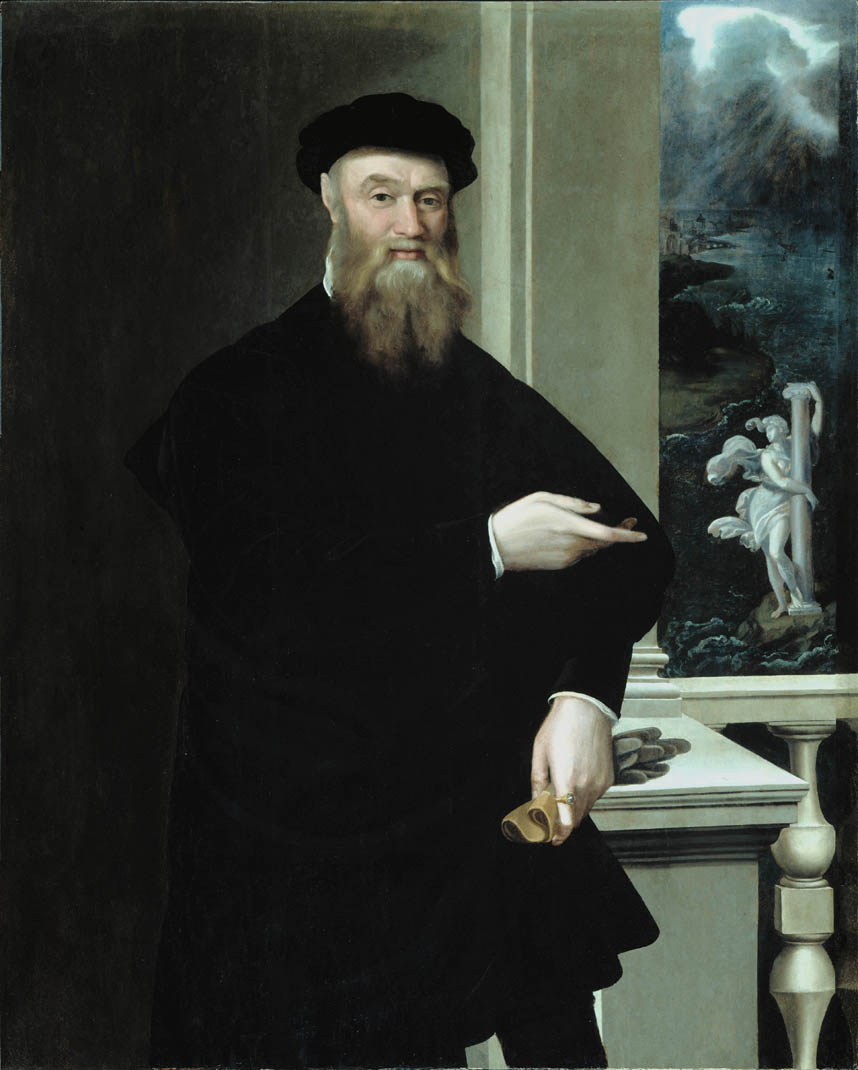
Portrait of Bindo Altoviti by Jacopino del Conte, 1550s

Bindo Altoviti was born in Rome in 1491 to Antonio, a Florentine nobleman, and to Dianora di Clarenza Cibo, Pope Innocent VIII's niece. Little is known about his youth or early education. As the Altoviti had blood ties with the houses of Cybo and Medici, and alliances with the della Rovere, Pope Julius II (Giuliano della Rovere) became a mentor to Bindo, as he was to his later papal successors Leo X (Giovanni de' Medici) and Clemente VII (Giulio de' Medici). Bindo was included among the young noblemen educated at the papal court, where he was in attendance on the hostage Federico Gonzaga, the son of Isabella d’Este and future duke of Mantua. During those years, he was also introduced to Bramante, Raphael, and Michelangelo.

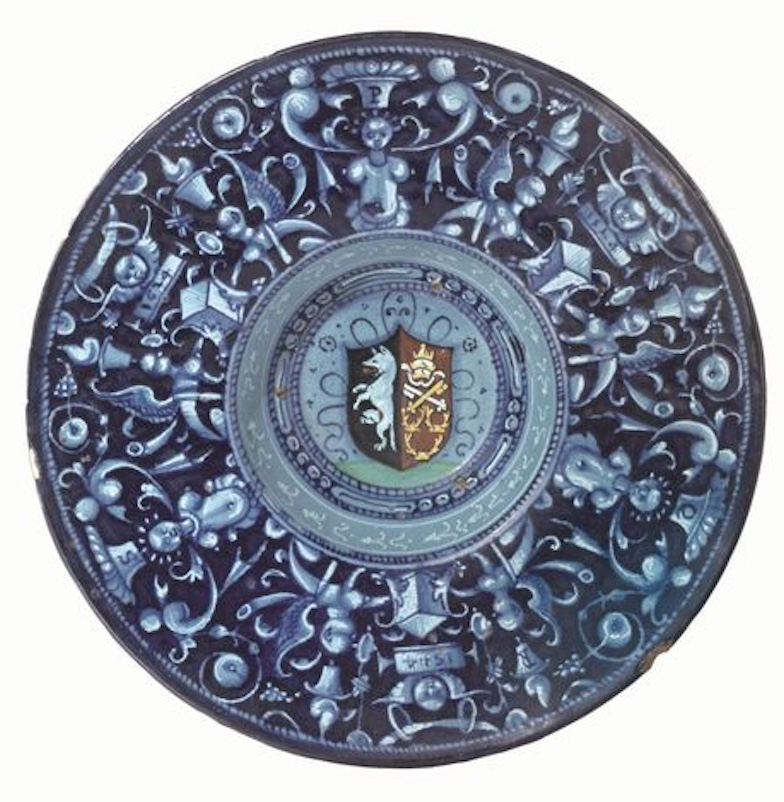
Tondino with the coat of arms of Bindo Altoviti, and of his wife Fiammetta Soderini

At this time, the Altoviti family had strong Republican leanings. Bindo became known not for just being a dashing young aristocrat, who had more to his credit than good looks, but was possibly prepared to risk wealth and power for his ideals. He married Fiammetta Soderini, niece of Piero Soderini, head of the Florentine government who had, together with his second chancellor Niccolò Machiavelli, unsuccessfully raised an army of national militia to defend Florence against the return of the Medici. However, remaining loyal to family, Bindo's career flourished under Leo X and Clemente VII. From the documents in the Vatican archives, it is possible to trace Bindo's rise to prominence as a banker. Respected at the papal court, he contributed to the festivities of Leo X. He established partnerships with the Spinelli, Ricci, Pucci and Ruspoli, promoting the career of Bartolomeo Ruspoli, who was related to cardinal Niccolò Ardinghelli, an influential member of the Farnese faction and an intimate associate of Alessandro Farnese, future Pope Paul III.

After the death of his banking rival Agostino Chigi and the sack of Rome in 1527, only a few very solid banks had the capital to prevent economic chaos. Competing with fierce Genoese bankers and the Germans Fugger and Welser, the Strozzi, Salviati and Altoviti became the leading Florentine and Papal curia bankers, given the opportunity to participate in massive credit transactions, controlling an enlarging sphere of papal finance.

Bindo was appointed as Depository-General, the leading banker of the Papal States and chief commissioner for collecting taxes, mainly allocated for the reconstruction of St. Peter's Basilica. He gradually expanded and diversified his financial activities, established branches of the Altoviti Bank in foreign money markets such as France, the Netherlands and England. Among his clients were Duke Charles III of Savoy and King Henry II of France and by shrewd political and financial acumen he amassed one of the largest private fortunes in Italy. His later life and wealth were centered on the Eternal City rather than Florence, but he still followed, and often intervened directly in, the political affairs of his Florentine home. The link was strong between the Altoviti and Strozzi families, dictated not only by kinship but also by political affiliation. He and wealthy businessman Filippo Strozzi the Younger financed the troops of Emperor Charles V and the siege of Florence in order to restore Medici rule.

Victorious in the Battle of Gavinana, Alessandro de' Medici, the illegitimate son of duke Lorenzo II de' Medici—though others believe he was in fact the son of Clement VII) and brother of Catherine de' Medici—became Duke of Florence and named Bindo as ducal counsel to public office.

After the death of his cousin and rival Ippolito de' Medici, Duke Alessandro had a falling-out with Filippo Strozzi, who had been, together with his wife Clarice de' Medici, the guardians of Catherine de' Medici after her father's death. Filippo Strozzi had conspired with Ippolito de' Medici to remove Alessandro from power.

When Alessandro was assassinated by Lorenzino de' Medici, Bindo found himself with a dilemma, torn between various family factions, political and financial interests. On one hand, he was the uncle of the assassin and gave Lorenzino money and advice how to escape, but on the other he was affiliated to the senior branch of the Medici. He chose to side with queen Catherine de' Medici (who was an enemy of her cousin Cosimo and had come to terms with Filippo Strozzi) and Paul III, whose grandson Ottavio Farnese, Duke of Parma married Margaret of Austria, the illegitimate daughter of Charles V and widow of Alessandro de' Medici.

In the wake of these events, Bindo became one of the leaders of the Florentine exiles in Rome. He provided major financial backing to the army of the Florentine exiles led by Filippo Strozzi. Defeated at the battle of Montemurlo, Filippo was captured, tortured and committed suicide in prison.

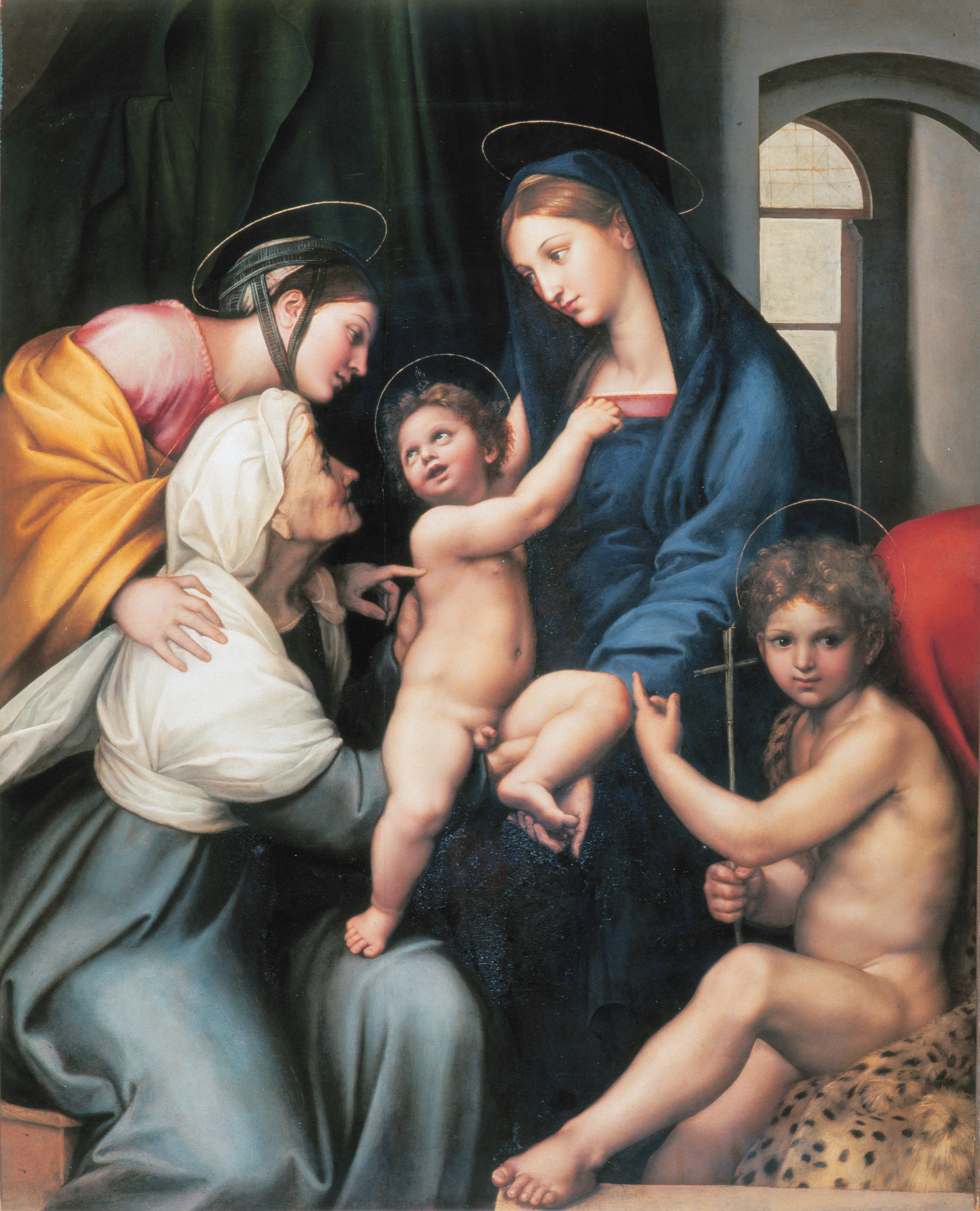
Madonna dell'Impannata by Raphael

Nonetheless, the new duke, Cosimo I de' Medici and the banker could not remain at odds for long. Cosimo's aunts, Cassandra Altoviti and Maria de' Medici Soderini, who was Bindo's sister-in-law, advised them to reconcile and Cosimo turned to the Altoviti Bank for considerable sums of money. Cosimo, careful to consolidate the alliances of his recent power, appointed Bindo Florentine consul in Rome, later senator, moves which kept him out of Florence but in no way mitigated their once again rising mutual contempt.

Paul III and Bindo backed Giulio Cybo in Genoa and Filippo Strozzi's son Piero Strozzi, who like his father was no real champion of Florentine liberties but had his own ambitions to secure greater power for his family. During the war of Siena, Bindo fitted out five companies of three thousand infantry, captained by his son Giambattista Altoviti, to join the rebel army. After their defeat in the Battle of Marciano, Piero Strozzi fled to France to the court of Catherine de' Medici. Many members of the Strozzi and Soderini families were exiled, imprisoned or declared rebels. Cosimo declared Bindo a rebel and confiscated all his property in Tuscany, including Raphael's Madonna dell'Impannata, which he took for his private chapel in the Palazzo Pitti.

However, Bindo was still protected by his patrons Paul III and Pope Julius III. In fact, he was the recipient of many favors and able to develop a complex financial empire, centered on various papal enterprises, ultimately rising to become one of the most influential bankers of his generation. He continued to support the exiles and the royal House of Valois of France. He gave a substantial loan to Catherine de' Medici's husband, King Henry II of France, hoping that the king would move against Florence, in the end he did not, because of his military commitments against England and Spain.

Bindo died in 1557, still confident of the liberation of Florence. With the hope of bringing his remains back to Florence, his family had erected a funeral monument in the church of Santi Apostoli, which remained vacant. Instead he was buried in the family chapel in the church of Santa Trinità dei Monte in Rome.

== Patron of the arts ==
Like other Florentines who provided loans to the popes in exchange for the rights to papal revenues, Bindo prospered. He enjoyed the financial resources to undertake extensive renovations to the properties he inherited from his father and his suburban villa on the Tiber, and to indulge a growing passion for art. Known for, and endowed with, a strong taste for art, he became a patron of the arts and friend to Cellini, Raphael, Michelangelo and Vasari.

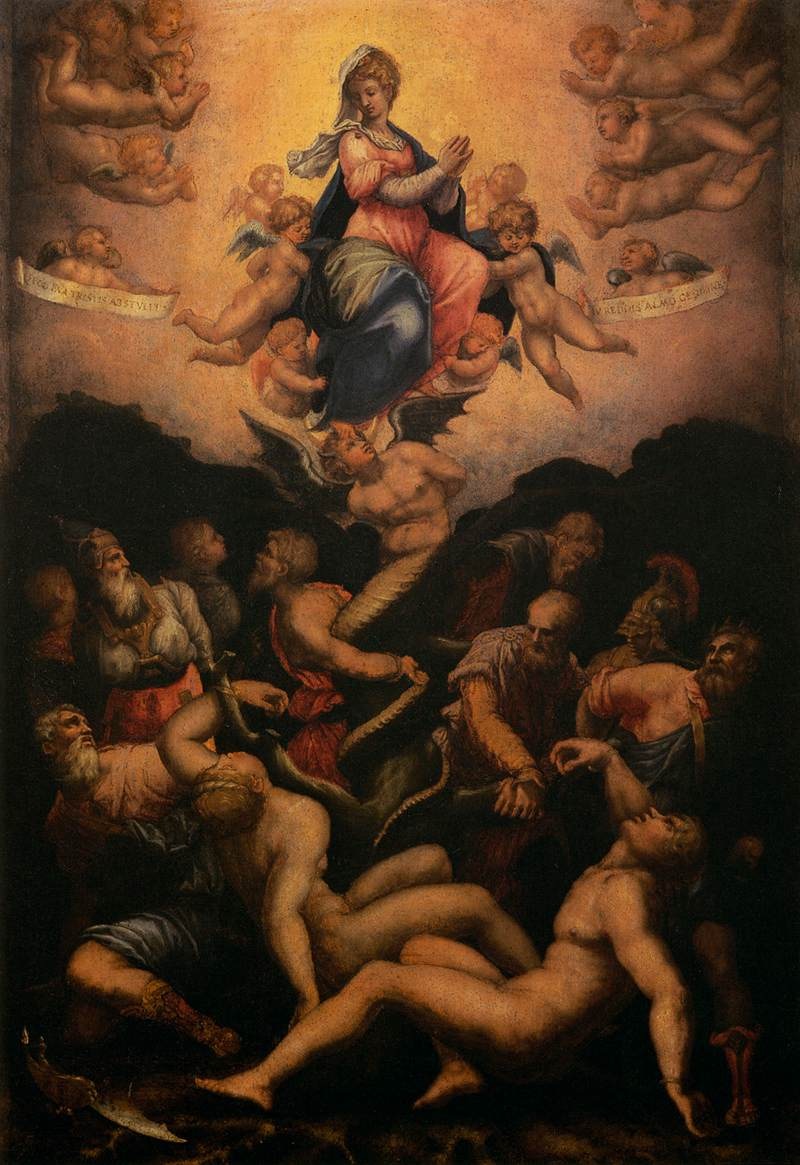
Allegory of the Immaculate Conception by Vasari, Altoviti chapel Santi Apostoli Florence

Immortalized in the portrait by Raphael, he gave sanctuary to Michelangelo when he fled from Florence to Rome. Michelangelo had such a high esteem for Bindo, while he despised his rival Agostino Chigi, that he gave him as a gift the cartoon of Noah's Blessing (lost), used for the fresco in the vault of the Sistine Chapel as well as a drawing of a Venus (lost) colored by Vasari. It was also Michelangelo who convinced Bindo not to rebuild, but to preserve, the Santi Apostoli church.

Vasari painted the Allegory of the Immaculate Conception for the family chapel. When in Rome, Vasari also used to stay at the Palazzo Altoviti where he frescoed the Triumph of Ceres. When the palazzo was demolished in order to create the Tiber's embankments, the frescos were removed and are now shown in the National Museum of Palazzo Venezia. For Bindo's suburban villa Vasari frescoed a vast loggia called the Vineyard, decorated with statues and burial marbles from Emperor Hadrian's Villa Adriana.

Andrea Sansovino also gave Bindo as a gift a terracotta model of the statue of St. James he sculpted for the Duomo in Florence.

== Descendants ==
Bindo's son Giovanni Battista Altoviti married Clarice Ridolfi, daughter of Lorenzo Ridolfi, grandson of Lorenzo il Magnifico di Medici and Clarice Orsini, bringing about a reconciliation between the houses of Altoviti, Medici and Strozzi. This made it possible for Bindo's other son, Archbishop of Florence Antonio Altoviti, finally to live in his bishopric. Giovanni Battista himself remained a banker in Rome, was twice consul of the Nazione Fiorentina, and exercised, under Pius V, the offices of an apostolic general and the Depositario dell'Abbondanza.

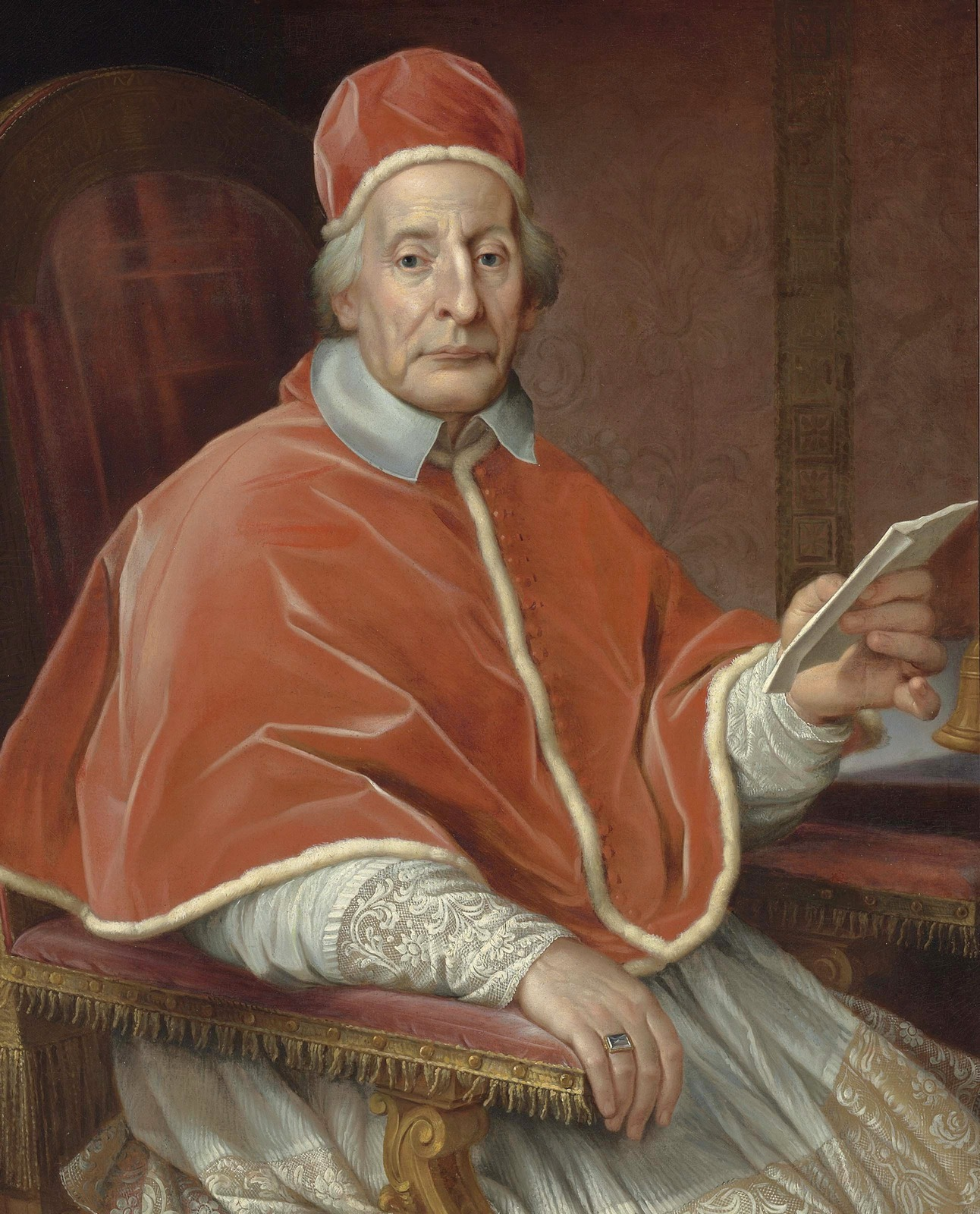
Pope Clemente XII, great-grandson of Marietta Altoviti Strozzi

Marietta Altoviti married Giambattista Strozzi, which also strengthened the linke between the houses of Strozzi and Medici. Their descendants became the Strozzi dukes of Bagnolo and princes of Forano, the Corsini princes of Sismano, dukes of Casigliano and Civitella, and most prominent Pope Clement XII.

Their granddaughter Lucrezia Maria Strozzi married Prince Aleksander Ludwik Radziwiłł, Voivode of Polock, Grand Marshal of Lithuania and member of the Radziwiłł family, magnates of Poland and Lithuania. Prince Anton Radziwiłł was the husband of Louise of Prussia. The couple were important patrons of the arts in Berlin during the 19th century. Their later heir Prince Stanisław Albrecht Radziwiłł was married to Caroline Lee Radziwill, sister of the late First Lady, Jacqueline Kennedy Onassis, and sister-in-law of President John F. Kennedy.
