= Madonna dell'Impannata =

Painting by Raphael

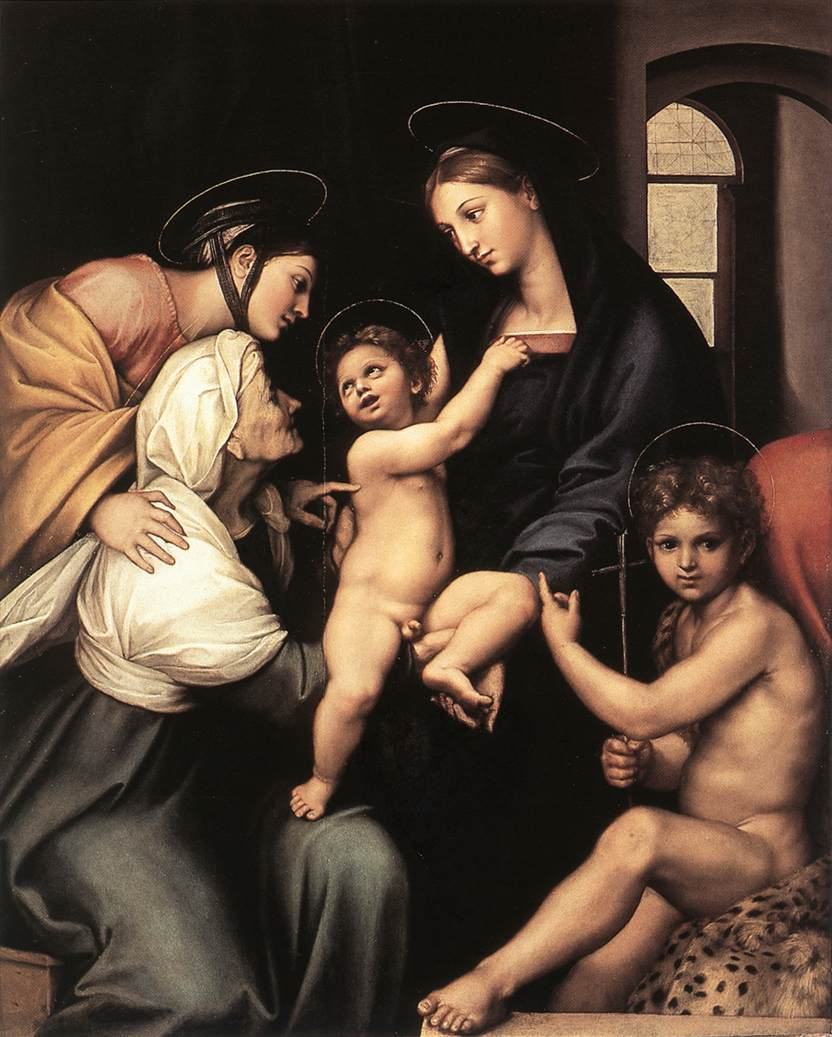
- Artists: Raphael and Workshop
- Year: c. 1513–1514
- Medium: oil on wood
- Dimensions: 158 cm × 125 cm (62 in × 49 in)
- Location: Palazzo Pitti, Florence

The Madonna dell'Impannata is an oil on panel (158x125 cm) painting by the Italian High Renaissance painter Raphael, executed c. 1513–1514. It has been preserved at the Palatine Gallery in Florence.

== History ==
Giorgio Vasari recorded that the painting was originally commissioned by Bindo Altoviti.

It portraits a very old Saint Anne who is seated and holds out to the Virgin her son. There is a Saint John seated, nude, and behind Saint Anne another female saint.

Bindo sent the Madonna dell'Impannata to his palace in Florence, where the picture remained until Duke Cosimo I de' Medici confiscated it for his own chapel, newly decorated by Raphael.

During the Napoleonic occupation, the painting was brought to Paris in 1799, and then returned in 1815 .

== See also ==
- List of paintings by Raphael
