= Garvey =

Garvey and O'Garvey are Irish surnames, derived from the Gaelic Ó Gairbhith, also spelt Ó Gairbheith, meaning "descendant of Gairbhith". Gairbhith itself means "rough peace".

There are three distinct Ó Gairbhith septs in Ireland:

- A sept of the over-kingdom of Ulaid, who were kin of the Mac Aonghusa. They were located in present-day County Down, Northern Ireland.
- A sept of the over-kingdom of Airgíalla, who were kin of the Ó hAnluain. They at one time ruled Uí Bresail, also known as Clann Breasail (Clanbrassil), located in the present-day barony of Oneilland East in County Armagh, Northern Ireland. At an early stage they were disposed of their territory by the Mac Cana sept of the neighbouring Clan Cana (Clancann).
- A sept of the Uí Ceinnselaig, who were at one time chiefs of Uí Feilmeadha Thuaidh, located in present-day barony of Rathvilly in County Carlow, Republic of Ireland.

The similar name MacGarvey, which derives from the Mac Gairbhith sept located in present-day County Donegal, Republic of Ireland, is not usually anglicised as Garvey.

== People ==
- Adrian Garvey (born 1968), Zimbabwean-born South African rugby union player
- Amy Ashwood Garvey (1897–1969), Jamaican Pan-Africanist activist, first wife of Marcus Garvey
- Amy Jacques Garvey (1895–1973), Jamaican-American journalist; widow of Marcus Garvey
- Anthony O'Garvey (1747–1766), Roman Catholic Bishop of Dromore
- Art Garvey (1900–1973), professional American football player
- Batty Garvey (1864–1932), English footballer
- Brian Garvey (comics) (born 1961), comic book artist
- Brian Garvey (footballer) (1937–2026), English former footballer
- Bruce Garvey (c. 1939–2010), British-born Canadian journalist and editor
- Chuck Garvey, American rock band guitarist
- Conor Garvey (fl. 2010s), Irish Gaelic footballer
- Cyndy Garvey (born 1949), American television personality, first wife of baseball player Steve Garvey
- Damien Garvey, Australian film and television actor
- Dan Edward Garvey (1886–1974), American politician, governor of Arizona 1948–1951
- Daniel Garvey, American educator and academic
- Ed Garvey (1940–2017), American lawyer, activist, and politician
- Edmund Garvey (1740–1813), Irish painter
- Eugene A. Garvey (1845–1920), Irish American Roman Catholic priest, first Bishop of Altoona, Pennsylvania
- Guy Garvey (born 1974), English rock singer and guitarist
- James Garvey (footballer) (1878–after 1901), English footballer
- James Garvey (Louisiana politician) (born 1964), American lawyer and politician
- James Garvey, American philosopher based in Britain
- Jane Garvey, American administrator of the FAA 1997–2002
- Jane Garvey (broadcaster) (born 1964), British radio presenter
- Jeanne Garvey, American politician
- John Garvey, several people
- Kate Garvey, British public relations executive
- Marcel Garvey (born 1983), English rugby union player
- Marcus Garvey (1887–1940), Jamaican journalist, founder of the Back-to-Africa movement
- Michael Garvey (Australian footballer) (born 1965), former Australian rules footballer
- Mike Garvey (born 1962), American NASCAR driver
- Philomena Garvey (1926–2009), Irish amateur golfer
- Rea Garvey (born 1973), Irish singer-songwriter and guitarist
- Robert Garvey (1908–1983), Jewish author
- Sir Ronald Garvey (1903–1991), British colonial administrator
- Steve Garvey (born 1948), American professional baseball player
- Steve Garvey, (born 1958), British bass guitarist of the punk band Buzzcocks
- Steve Garvey (footballer) (born 1973), English former professional footballer
- Sir Terence Garvey (1915–1986), British diplomat, High Commissioner to India and Ambassador to the USSR
- W. Timothy Garvey (born 1952), American professor of medicine

== Fictional characters ==
- Quinn Garvey, in the American TV series How I Met Your Mother.
- The Garvey family, in the British TV series Benidorm. The family consists of Mick, Janice, Michael and Chantelle (Telle).
- Preston Garvey, in the post apocalyptic video game Fallout 4 released in 2015.
- Eugene Garvey, in the British TV series Waterloo Road (series 7).
- The Garvey family, in the TV show Little House on the Prairie played by Merlin Olsen, Hersha Parady, and Patrick Labyorteaux.
- The Garvey Family in the TV series The Leftovers: estranged wife, Laurie, children, Tom and Jill, and father, Kevin, played by Justin Theroux.

== See also ==
- Garvey School District, pre-K-8 school district serving the San Gabriel Valley in Southern California
- Garvey, a townland in Carnteel parish, County Tyrone, Northern Ireland
- Garvey Avenue, San Gabriel Valley, California
- Garvey Park, a multi-use stadium in Tavua, Fiji
- Garvie, spelling variation
- Garvin, spelling variation
- Garvan, spelling variation
- Bergin & Garvey, a publisher later subsumed by Greenwood Publishing
