= 1936 visit by Eugenio Pacelli to the United States =

Catholic Cardinal's visit to the USA

Pacelli (center), before his meeting with President Roosevelt in Hyde Park, New York, with (left to right): Count Enrico Galeazzi, Joseph P. Kennedy Sr., Bishop Stephen Donahue, Marvin H. McIntyre, and Frank Comerford Walker.

Eugenio Cardinal Pacelli (the soon-to-be Pope Pius XII) visited the United States for two weeks in October–November 1936 as Cardinal Secretary of State and Camerlengo of the Holy Roman Church. At the time, Pacelli was the highest-ranking Catholic official ever to visit the US. Although he did not visit the US as Pope, he was the first Pope who visited the US at any time in his life.

Pacelli met with President Franklin D. Roosevelt, investigated Roosevelt's radio critic Rev. Charles Coughlin, and visited New York City, Washington, D.C., Boston, Saint Paul, MN, and Chicago. The media nicknamed Pacelli "The Flying Cardinal" due to his five-day coast-to-coast air tour. Pacelli planned to silence Coughlin for Roosevelt in exchange for his support against Communism and, more importantly, in an attempt to achieve diplomatic recognition of the sovereignty of Vatican City.

Monsignor Giuseppe Pizzardo, the Secretary of Extraordinary Affairs, served as acting Secretary of State during Pacelli's absence. Pope Pius XI also cut short his vacation at Castel Gandolfo to return to the Vatican during Pacelli's absence.

== Itinerary ==
=== Arrival ===
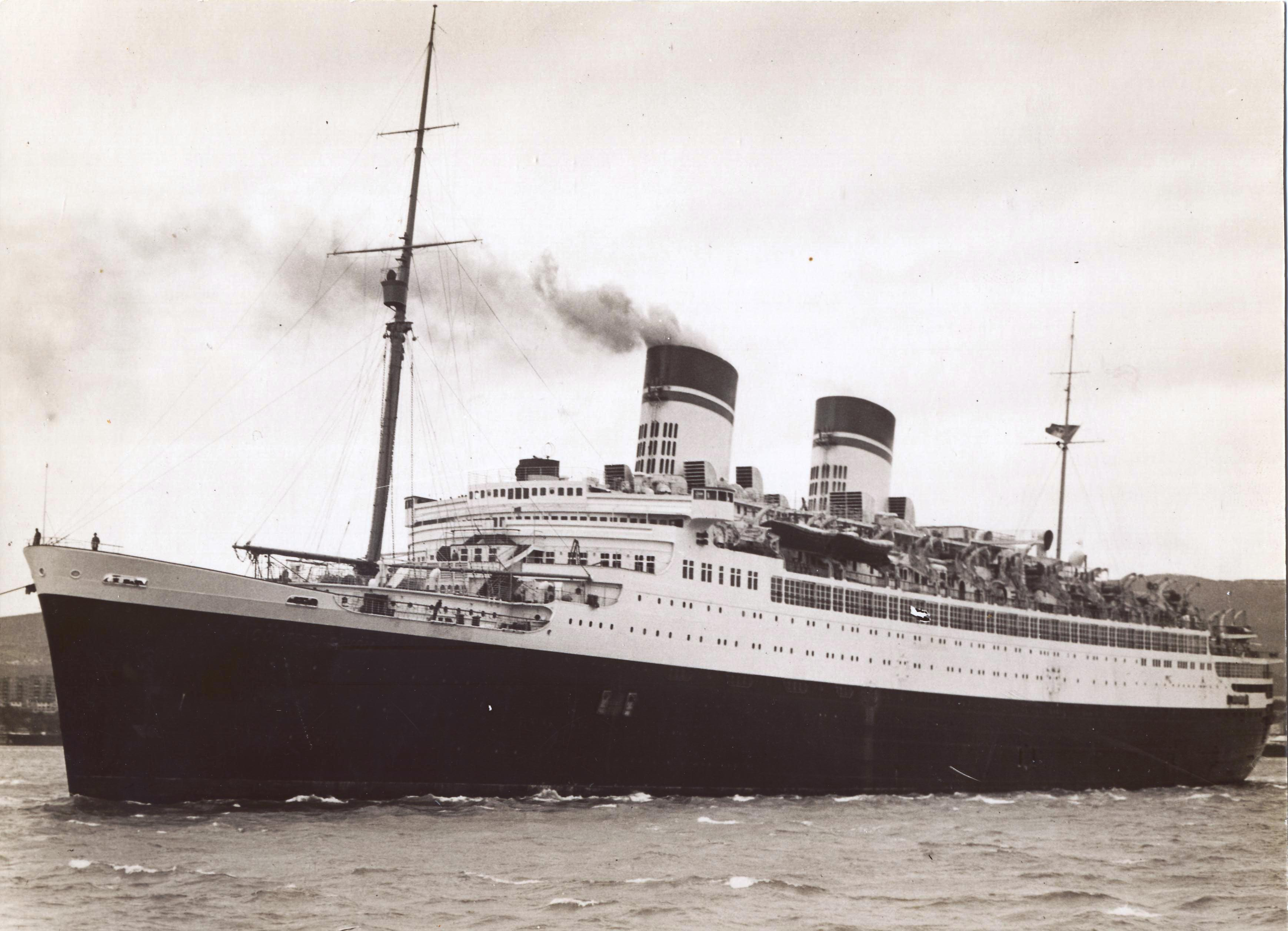
Pacelli arrived on the SS Conte di Savoia, which waited for him in New York for his return voyage.

It was customary for Pacelli to take an annual vacation, and he changed his plans from Switzerland at the last moment. According to The New York Times, no secretaries or officials accompanied Pacelli, only Enrico Galeazzi, his gentleman-in-waiting and a Vatican City architect. In fact, The New York Times failed to report the presence of Sister Pascalina Lehnert, the secretary and confidant of Pacelli since the time of his nunciature to Germany.

Pacelli left Naples on October 1 aboard the Italian liner Conte di Savoia, joined by Fulvio Suvich, the Italian ambassador to the US; Prince Marcello Gentili del Drago, the secretary of the embassy; and Bishop Hugh Lamb of Philadelphia.

=== New York ===
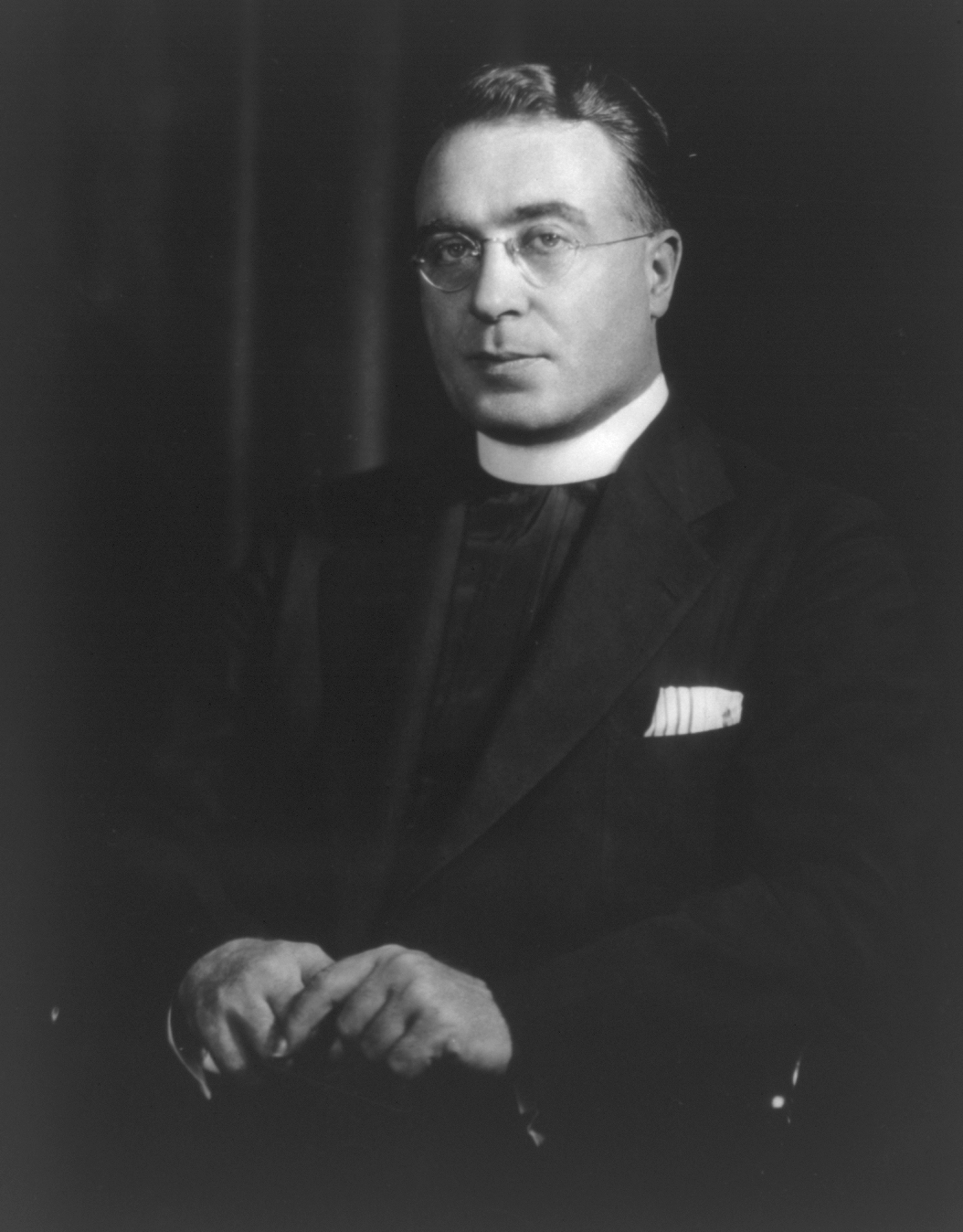
Rev. Charles Coughlin, a prominent radio critic of Roosevelt's, was silenced by Pacelli's visit.

Pacelli arrived in New York on October 8 and first met with Cardinal Patrick Joseph Hayes and Apostolic Delegate Amleto Giovanni Cicognani, along with many other Catholic bishops, clergy members, and prominent laymen. Pacelli delivered a brief and vague prepared statement to reporters and brushed off questions about Coughlin and potential diplomatic recognition of the Vatican. Before Pacelli had even met with Coughlin, all of the candidates of Coughlin's Union party withdrew their candidacy for New York public office; rumors circulated that Pacelli's visit was related to their withdrawals.

In New York, Pacelli was the guest at Inisfada, the Manhasset, Long Island home of Genevieve Garvan Brady, the widow of Nicholas Frederic Brady, one of New York's wealthiest public utility directors and financiers; a large papal donor in her own right, she was created a Dame of Malta and a papal Duchess. While in New York, Pacelli met with Nicholas Murray Butler, the president of Columbia University, and celebrated a pontifical Mass in St. Patrick's Cathedral.

=== Boston ===
Pacelli was accompanied by Bishop Francis Spellman (future Cardinal) to Boston on October 12. Spellman was a trusted friend and reliable fundraiser for Pacelli; the Bishop had boarded the ocean liner even before Pacelli disembarked to offer him a set of secular-style clothing which was refused. Despite the best efforts of Cardinal O'Connell, Spellman's superior, Spellman had in fact organized most of the trip himself.

Pacelli returned to New York on October 15, before heading to Philadelphia. Coughlin was in Boston at the same time as Pacelli, but the two did not meet.

=== Connecticut ===
The future Pope visited the Knights of Columbus at their headquarters in New Haven.

=== Philadelphia ===
In Philadelphia, Pacelli met with Cardinal Dennis Joseph Dougherty. Pacelli spent two days in Philadelphia before returning to Long Island for the remainder of the week.

=== Washington, D.C. ===
As early as October 17, Vatican sources announced that a meeting with President Roosevelt would take place, but denied that Coughlin would be discussed. Pacelli spent the night of October 21 in the capital, dining with the Apostolic Delegate, and visiting the Catholic University of America, the Library of Congress, National Catholic Welfare Congress, Mount Vernon, and Georgetown University the next day. His speech before the National Press Club was broadcast.

Earlier that day, Pacelli interrupted a train trip to spend a one-hour visit in Baltimore. After being greeted by Archbishop Michael J. Curley and a gathering of Baltimore clergy, he went immediately to the Cathedral of the Assumption of the Blessed Virgin Mary, where they knelt in prayer at the main altar for several minutes and then visited the crypt of Cardinal James Gibbons. Pope Pius XI raised the cathedral to the rank of a minor basilica a few months later.

=== Air tour ===
Pacelli then embarked on a five-day coast-to-coast air tour covering seven cities, departing from Roosevelt Field on Long Island on a plane chartered from United Airlines. Accompanying Pacelli on the plane were Bishop Spellman, Basil Harris, the VP of United States Lines, Galeazzo, Cavenaugh, Kelly, and one of Mrs. Brady's advisers. The cities included were Cleveland, South Bend, Indiana, Chicago, St. Paul, Minnesota, San Francisco, Los Angeles, St. Louis, Cincinnati, Syracuse, and New York City.

In South Bend, Pacelli was received by bishop John Noll and Notre Dame president John Francis O'Hara. Pacelli received an honorary doctorate from the University of Notre Dame. In Chicago, Pacelli met Cardinal George Mundelein. With the presidential election impending, the Vatican made clear that it disapproved of the anti-Roosevelt rhetoric of Coughlin, a Catholic priest, making clear that Pacelli was gathering information on him.

Arriving finally in New York, Pacelli said Mass at the Church of St. Ignatius Loyola and received another honorary doctorate from Fordham University.

=== Meeting with Roosevelt ===
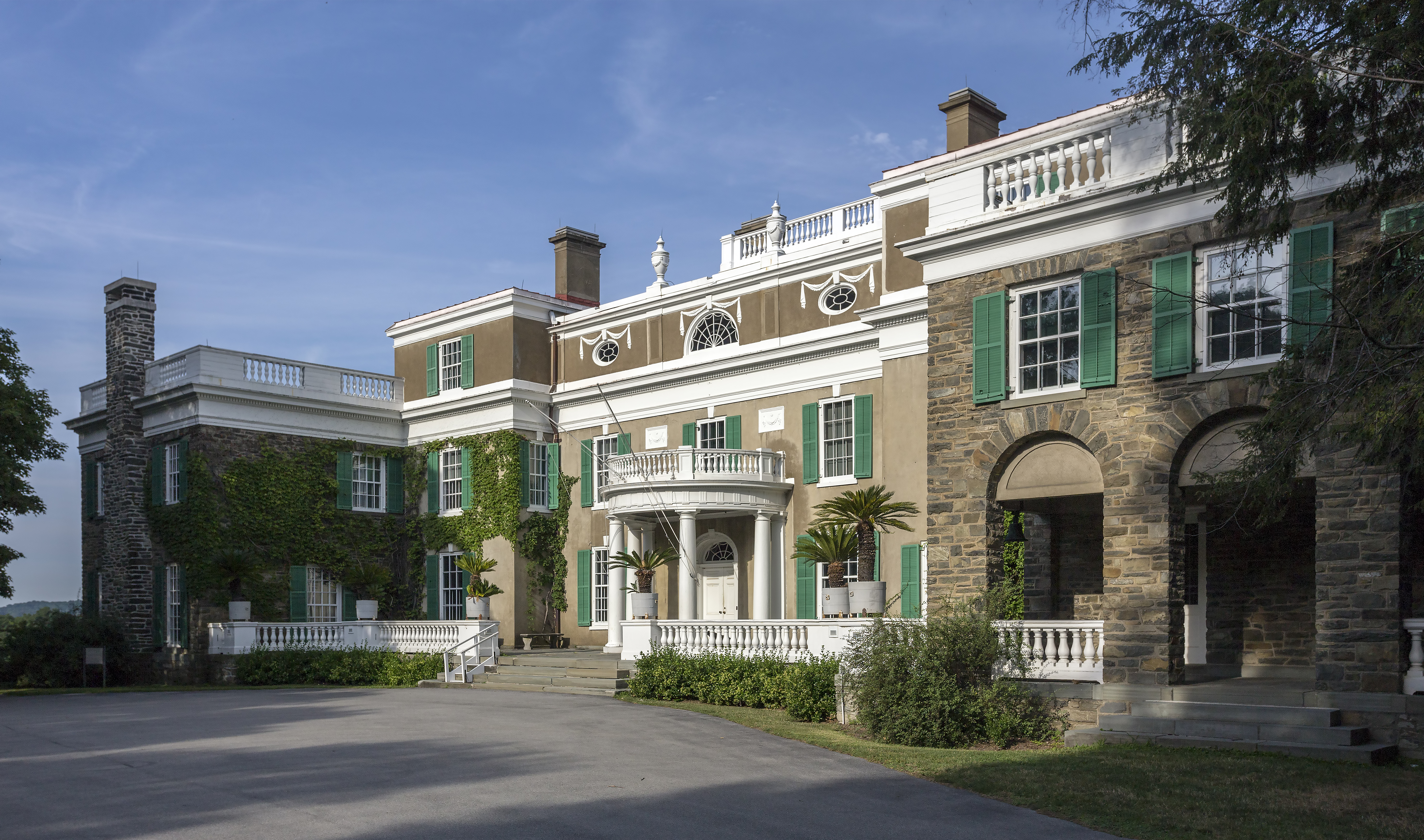
Roosevelt's home in Hyde Park, New York, where the meeting took place.

On November 5, Pacelli finally met with Roosevelt at the President's home in Hyde Park, New York, for two hours over lunch. Pacelli congratulated Roosevelt on his election victory the previous day. At a press conference with reporters, Spellman reiterated to the press corps that they were prohibited from asking any questions about Coughlin, which he assured them Pacelli would not answer.

=== Departure ===
Pacelli met with Mayor Fiorello H. La Guardia and former Governor Alfred E. Smith before departing on the SS Conte di Savoia, which was waiting at Pier 59, on November 6. Pacelli arrived back in Rome on November 14, where he was immediately received by Pius XI to detail his visit.

== Significance ==
=== American perceptions of Fascism ===
According to D'Agostino, "historians have neglected to consider how Pacelli's visit communicated to observers that the Holy See and Fascist Italy shared a special relationship". Not only did Pacelli travel with Italy's new ambassador, Fulvio Savich, but the two became close companions during the lengthy voyage. At the wishes of Foreign Minister Count Galeazzo Ciano, Mussolini's son-in-law, Italian consular officials were invited to dine with Pacelli when he joined the Cardinals of Philadelphia, Boston, and Chicago.

=== Vatican-US relations ===
In their meeting, Pacelli secured from Roosevelt a promise to appoint a US representative to the Holy See. No such diplomatic link had existed since 1870, when the Risorgimento seized the territories of the Papal States, all but ending the papacy's temporal power. The Senate had withdrawn the stipend for such a diplomat in 1867, seeing little value in maintaining the outpost. Roosevelt appointed an informal "personal envoy", which did not require Senate approval. By the time of the meeting, the Senate opposition was primarily rooted in Protestant objections, rather than cost. Roosevelt did not fulfill his promise until December 1939, when he appointed Myron Charles Taylor as his personal representative to Pius XII; Taylor's appointment was renewed by Truman and lasted until 1950.

The Wartime Correspondence Between President Roosevelt and Pope Pius XII were published in 2005 with the foreword and notes of Taylor.

=== Coughlin and the 1936 election ===
Roosevelt's 1936 landslide victory occurred during Pacelli's visit.

Both Pius XII's defenders and critics have implied the existence of a deal between Pacelli and Roosevelt to silence Father Charles Coughlin, the leading Catholic critic of the New Deal, in exchange for diplomatic recognition of the Vatican. According to Cornwell, "an unspoken quid pro quo of the visit was an exchange of favors between Pacelli and President Roosevelt. Roosevelt wanted help quelling the Catholic radio priest Father Charles Coughlin, who preached weekly and subversively to an audience of fifteen million Americans". Dalin, otherwise a critic of Cornwell, is content to repeat the claim that Pacelli played a "behind-the-scenes role in silencing" Coughlin, for his own part wishing to emphasize Coughlin's personal anti-Semitism.

Indeed, on November 8, shortly after Pacelli's departure, Coughlin announced that he was making his final radio broadcast. Of course, it remains unclear what, if anything, Pacelli might have said to Coughlin to induce such a change. Although Dalin claims that Coughlin's (and thus Pacelli's) role in the presidential election was potentially decisive, Roosevelt's victory was in fact a foregone landslide (carrying every state but Maine and Vermont).
