= Garvan =

Garvan may refer to:

== People ==
- Francis Patrick Garvan (1875–1937), American lawyer, president of the Chemical Foundation
- Frank Garvan (born 1955), Australian mathematician
- Genevieve Garvan Brady (1880–1938), American philanthropist and Papal duchess
- Garvan McCarthy (born 1981), retired Irish sportsperson
- Gerry Garvan, former Irish footballer and coach who played as a midfielder
- James Garvan (1843–1896), Australian politician
- John Garvan Murtha (born 1941), United States federal judge
- Liz Garvan, camogie player
- Noel Garvan (born 1978), Gaelic football player from Laois in Ireland
- Owen Garvan (born 1988), Irish footballer
- P. J. Garvan (1928–2021), Irish hurler
- Verna Cook Garvan (1910–1993), American philanthropist

== Places ==
- Garvan, Gabrovo Province, a village in Bulgaria
- Garvan, Iran, a village in Sistan and Baluchestan Province, Iran
- Garvan, a village in Konče Municipality, North Macedonia
- Garvăn, a village in Jijila, Tulcea County, Romania
- Garvan Woodland Gardens, a botanical garden in Hot Springs, Arkansas, United States

== Other uses ==
- Garvan–Olin Medal, annual award for service to chemistry by women chemists
- Garvan Institute of Medical Research, founded in 1963 by the Sisters of Charity
