= Anthony N. Brady =

French-born American businessman

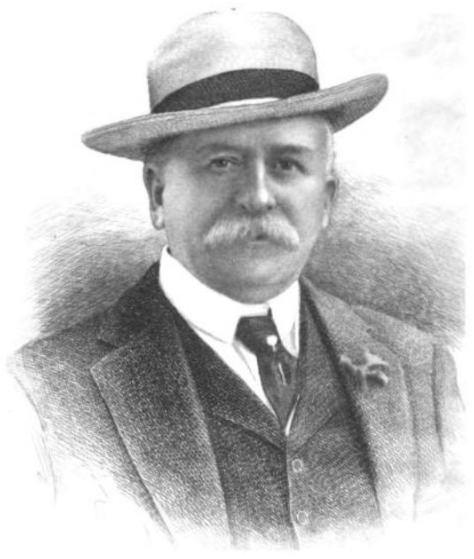
- Born: Anthony Nicholas Brady; August 22, 1841; Lille, France
- Died: July 22, 1913 (aged 71); London, England
- Resting place: St. Agnes Cemetery, Menands, New York
- Occupation: Businessman
- Spouse: Marcia Ann Myers (m. 1867)
- Children: 6, including Nicholas Frederic

Anthony Nicholas Brady (August 22, 1841 – July 22, 1913) was an American businessman who amassed great wealth and at one time was the largest shareholder in the American Tobacco Company.

== Early life ==
Anthony Nicholas Brady was born on August 22, 1841, in Lille, France. Brady, whose family was Irish, emigrated to Troy, New York, in 1857.

== Career ==
At nearly age 16, he first began working at the Delevan Hotel in Albany, New York, and by age 19, he went into business for himself, opening a tea store that he soon expanded with other outlets, "practically controll[ing] the trade in that city and in Troy". He went on to become a politically astute transportation magnate, who used his genius at consolidation to acquire control of Brooklyn Rapid Transit as well as the Albany Gas Light Company. Later he was a dominant figure in the transportation systems of several American cities including Philadelphia and Washington, D.C., plus that of Paris. Brady would acquire significant investments in a substantial number of companies and was the largest shareholder and a director of American Tobacco Company by 1900, and successor companies (Consolidated Tobacco Company) in subsequent years.

Brady partnered with leading East Coast business tycoons such as Thomas Edison, William C. Whitney, P. A. B. Widener and Thomas F. Ryan in various business ventures including the Electric Vehicle Co., initially a motorized taxicab business that evolved into Maxwell Automobile Co. By 1907, he was a member of the Consolidated Stock Exchange of New York, one of around 1,300.

== Personal life ==
On August 20, 1867, Brady was married to Marcia Ann Myers (1847–1921), the daughter of a prominent Vermont jurist, with whom he had six children, two sons and four daughters. She was an Episcopalian and the children were raised in that faith (although their son Nicholas converted to Catholicism before his 1906 wedding).

- Margaret Ruth Brady (1872–1944), who married James Charles Farrell, the treasurer of the Helderberg Cement Company.
- Flora Brady (1877–1912), who married Erastus Palmer Gavit, the secretary and treasurer of the Municipal Gas Company who was a grandson of Erastus Dow Palmer.
- Nicholas Frederic Brady (1878–1930), who married Genevieve Garvan (1880–1938), in 1906.
- James Cox Brady Sr. (1882–1927), who married 1stly Elizabeth Hamilton (1883–1912), a daughter of Andrew Hamilton, and 2ndly in 1914 Lady Victoria Pery (1893–1918), daughter of William Pery, 4th Earl of Limerick.
- Marcia Myers Brady (1884–1976), who married Carll Tucker in 1908.
- Mabel Brady (1885–1979), who married Francis Patrick Garvan.

Brady died in 1913 at the Hotel Carlton in London while on a business trip. His remains were brought back to the United States where he was interred at the Roman Catholic Saint Agnes Cemetery in Menands, New York. He is considered to have been one of the 100 wealthiest Americans, having left an enormous fortune. After his death, his sons, James and Nicholas, continued to successfully operate his vast business empire. In 1923, however, a family feud erupted when two of their sisters took them to court, charging irregularities in the management of their father's estate. After years of litigation, the suit was finally dismissed in 1924.

=== Descendants ===
Anthony N. Brady was the grandfather of Nicholas Frederick Brady (b. 1930), a former U.S. Senator from New Jersey, and U.S. Secretary of the Treasury under Presidents Ronald Reagan and George H. W. Bush.

=== Legacy ===
The Anthony N. Brady Memorial Laboratory, School of Medicine, Yale University is named in his honor.

== See also ==
- Irwin v. Gavit
