= University of Alabama at Birmingham School of Medicine =

Public medical school in Birmingham, Alabama, US

University of Alabama at Birmingham Heersink School of Medicine
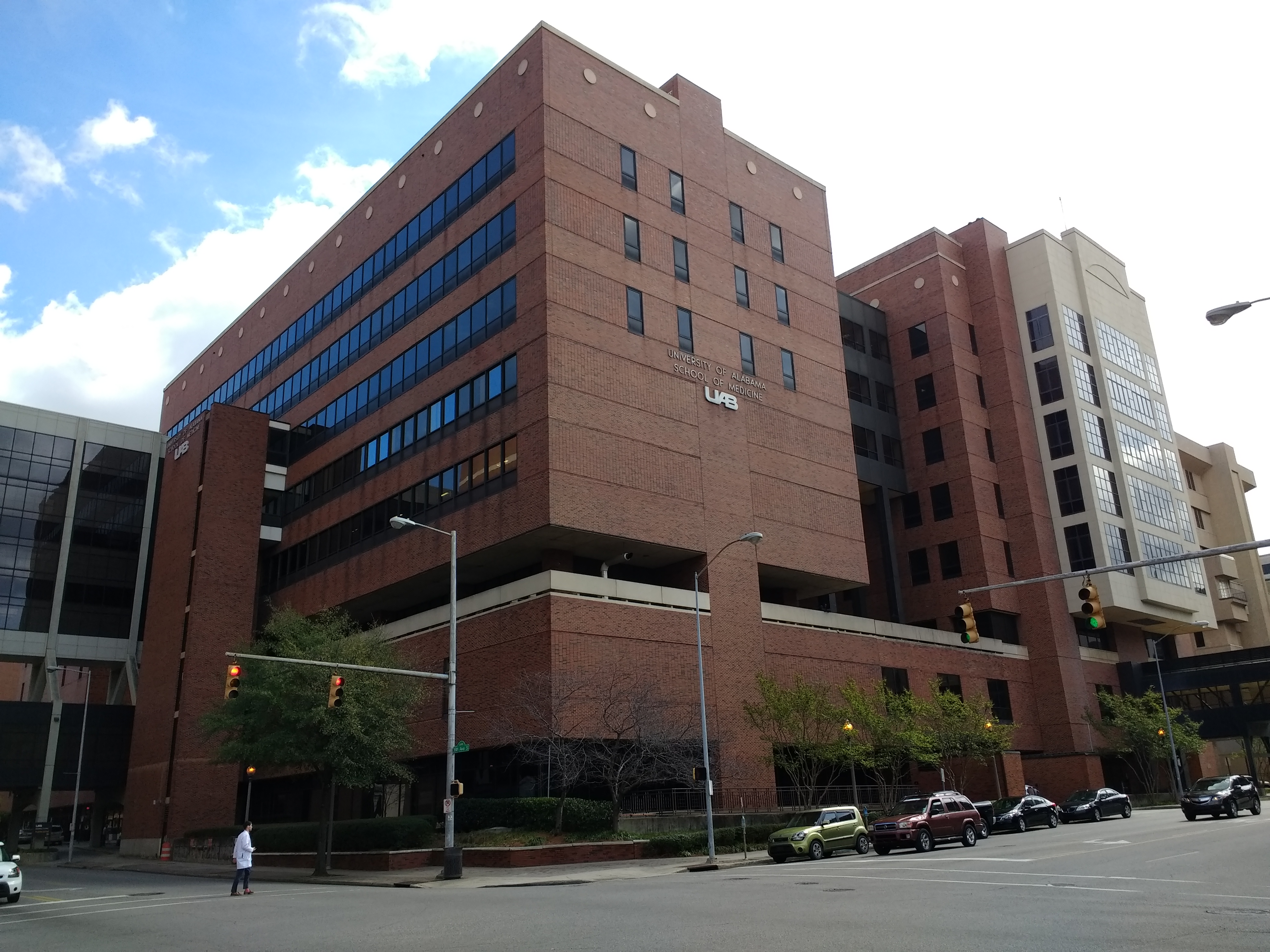
- Former names: University of Alabama at Birmingham School of Medicine, Medical College of Alabama
- Type: Public
- Established: 1859
- Parent institution: University of Alabama at Birmingham
- Dean: Anupam Agarwal
- Location: Birmingham, Alabama, U.S. 33.500000°N 86.807500°W
- Website: https://www.uab.edu/medicine/home/

The University of Alabama at Birmingham Marnix E. Heersink School of Medicine is the medical school of the University of Alabama at Birmingham (UAB) located in Birmingham, Alabama, United States with branch campuses in Huntsville, Montgomery, and Tuscaloosa. Residency programs are also located in Selma, Huntsville, and Montgomery. It is part of the University of Alabama at Birmingham (UAB) and the UAB Health System .

== Founding and growth ==
The School of Medicine at UAB can trace its roots to the 1859 founding of the Medical College of Alabama in Mobile, Alabama. The move of the college from Mobile to Tuscaloosa took effect in 1920.

In 1936, the University of Alabama Extension Center was opened in Birmingham. In 1943, Governor Chauncey Sparks created the four-year Medical College of Alabama with the passage of the Jones Bill (Alabama Act 89). In 1944, Roy R. Kracke was named dean of the Medical College of Alabama and began assembling teaching staff.

In 1945, the Medical College of Alabama was moved from Tuscaloosa to Birmingham and the university's medical center was founded. In November 1966, the Extension Center and the Medical Center were merged to form the "University of Alabama in Birmingham", an organizational component of The University of Alabama. In 1969, UAB became an independent institution, one of three autonomous universities within the newly created University of Alabama System. The university's name was changed in 1984 from the "University of Alabama in Birmingham" to the "University of Alabama at Birmingham".

In 2021, the UAB School of Medicine received a $95 million single lead gift from a longtime supporter of UAB, Dr. Marnix E. Heersink, resulting to naming the medical school in honor of his name to UAB Marnix E. Heersink School of Medicine, with an additional $5 million from Triton Health Systems, that total in $100 million, the largest single philanthropic donation and gift in UAB history.

The UAB Heersink School of Medicine is home to The Kirklin Clinic, a multi-disciplinary medical home; University Hospital; and faculty serve the new Children's of Alabama hospital.

== Leadership ==
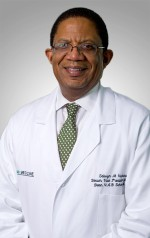
Selwyn Vickers, M.D.

On August 15, 2013, UAB announced Selwyn Vickers, M.D., would be the next senior vice president for Medicine and dean of the School of Medicine effective October 15, 2013. Vickers spent his formative years as a young faculty member at UAB, beginning in 1994, and he directed the section of gastrointestinal surgery from 2000 to 2006. He was previously the Jay Phillips Professor and Chair of the Department of Surgery at the University of Minnesota Medical School.

Anupam Agarwal, M.D., served as interim dean of the School of Medicine for eight months from February to October 2013 after Ray Watts, M.D., former dean of the School of Medicine, was named the seventh president of UAB in January 2013. Agarwal returned to his position as director of the Division of Nephrology and vice chair for research in the Department of Medicine on October 15, 2013.

== Campuses ==
The main campus of UAB Heersink School of Medicine is located in Birmingham, Alabama within the city's medical district.

=== Tuscaloosa ===
The UAB Tuscaloosa Regional Campus is the home for the Primary Care Track with foundation in clinical medicine that is housed at the University of Alabama's College of Community Health Sciences.

=== Huntsville ===
The UAB School of Medicine maintains a branch campus in Huntsville affiliated with Huntsville Hospital. The Huntsville campus was originally a part of the University of Alabama in Huntsville; however, in 1974 UAB assumed control over the Huntsville program.

=== Montgomery ===
UAB's Montgomery campus is a collaborative effort among UAB, Baptist Health and the city of Montgomery. Beginning in May 2014, 10 third-year medical students began taking classes in Montgomery.

== Distinctions ==
- In 1960, Dr. Basil Hirschowitz was the first to explore the stomach with his new invention, the fiber-optic endoscope, which is now in the Smithsonian Institution.
- UAB heart surgeon, the late John W. Kirklin, developed a computerized intensive care unit that became a model for modern ICUs around the world. They help improve care and reduce complications. Kirklin initially gained fame by improving the safety and usefulness of the heart-lung bypass pump.
- The Diabetes Research and Education Hospital was dedicated in March 1973, as the first public, university-affiliated diabetes hospital in the nation.
- In 1977, Dr. Richard Whitley administered systemic antiviral for the treatment of the deadly HSV (herpes simplex virus) encephalitis, leading to the world's first effective treatment for a viral disease.
- The first use in the United States of color doppler echocardiography for visualizing internal cardiac structures was introduced by Dr. Navin C. Nanda and occurred at UAB Hospital in 1984.
- In 1986, Dr. Thomas N. James, then chairman of UAB's Department of Medicine, presided over the tenth World Congress of Cardiology held in Washington, D.C.
- World's first genetically engineered mouse-human monoclonal antibody was used at University Hospital in the treatment of cancer in 1987.
- Dr. John Richard Montgomery, known for co-implementing the environmental bubble used to protect David Vetter, has served as the chief of pediatric programs at the Huntsville campus.
- The first simultaneous heart-kidney transplant in the Southeast was performed at UAB by doctors David C. McGiffin and David Laskow in 1995.
- The journal Science named three UAB faculty, doctors Michael Saag, George Shaw, and Beatrice Hahn, among the top 10 AIDS researchers in the country, and highlighted the AIDS research program at UAB in 1996.
- The AIDS Vaccine Evaluation Unit (AVEU) became the first evaluation unit to enter a Phase III trial of an AIDS vaccine in 1999.
- UAB's Kidney Transplantation Program is the world's leading transplant program, with more than 5,000 transplants being performed since 1968. In each of the last seven years, more kidney transplants have been performed at UAB than at any other institution in the world. UAB is also a national leader in other organ transplants.
- The UAB AIDS Center was the first to perform clinical trials of the protease inhibitor Indinavir (Crixivan), one of the first protease inhibitors used in the [triple-drug cocktail] to fight HIV.
- UAB hosts one of only 45 Medical Scientist Training Programs in the country. A highly selective program funded by grants from the National Institutes of Health, the UAB MSTP offers students the ability to earn both an M.D. and a Ph.D during a 6- to 8-year time period. During this time, all tuition is waived and a stipend of $25,000 per year is awarded. Generally, 6 to 10 students per year are admitted to the program.
- UAB pioneered and performed the first successful surgery involving the transplant of a kidney from a pig into a human. The kidney was transplanted to a brain dead human, whose body successfully accepted the kidney and began producing urine as a normal kidney would. This is the world's first peer-reviewed successful transplant of its type.

== Notable faculty and alumni ==
- Regina Benjamin, former Surgeon General of the United States, attained her medical degree from the University of Alabama School of Medicine.
- Anne Haney Cross, American neurologist and neuroimmunologist
- Marie-Carmelle Elie, Chair of the Department of Emergency Medicine, first Black woman to chair an Emergency Medicine department at a major American medical school
- W. Timothy Garvey, Butterworth Professor of Medicine, Director of Diabetes Research Center
- Tinsley R. Harrison, who served as dean of the Medical School and chair of the Department of Medicine, was the editor of the first five editions of Harrison's Principles of Internal Medicine.
- Jeanne Marrazzo, director of the University of Alabama at Birmingham School of Medicine Division of Infectious Diseases
- Emma Sadler Moss (1898–1970), pathologist
- Michael Saag, physician and prominent HIV/AIDS researcher at the University of Alabama at Birmingham School of Medicine
