= Garvie =

Scottish surname

Garvie is a surname of Scottish origin. Notable people with the surname include:

- Bill Garvie (1910–1944), Australian rules footballer
- Eddie Garvie (1892–1915), Scottish footballer
- Elizabeth Garvie (b. 1957), English actress
- Lawrence Garvie (b. 1933), Canadian lawyer and politician
- Thomas Bowman Garvie (1859–1944), English artist
- Wayne Garvie (b. 1963), BBC Worldwide Managing Director
- William Garvie (1837–1872), Canadian lawyer, journalist and politician

== Island ==
- Garvie Island (An Garbh-eilean), east of Cape Wrath in Scotland

== See also ==
- Garvey
