= Tullygarvey =

Tullygarvey Teallach Ghairbhíth (Irish)
- Barony
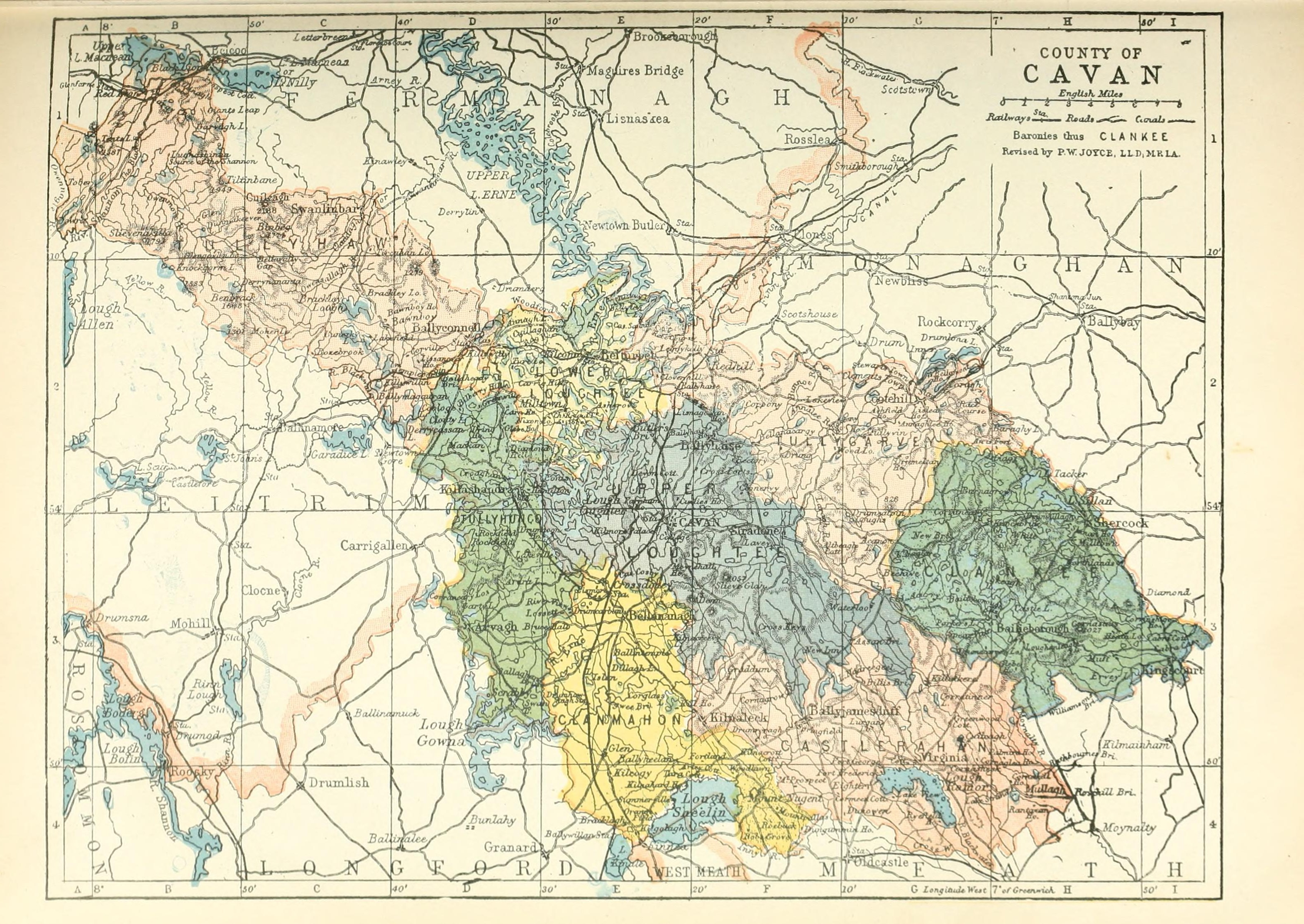
- Barony map of County Cavan, 1900; Tullygarvey is in the northeast, coloured peach.

- Location within Ireland
- Coordinates: 54°3′N 7°8′W
- Sovereign state: Ireland
- Province: Ulster
- County: Cavan

Area
  - Total: 242.29 km^{2} (93.55 sq mi)

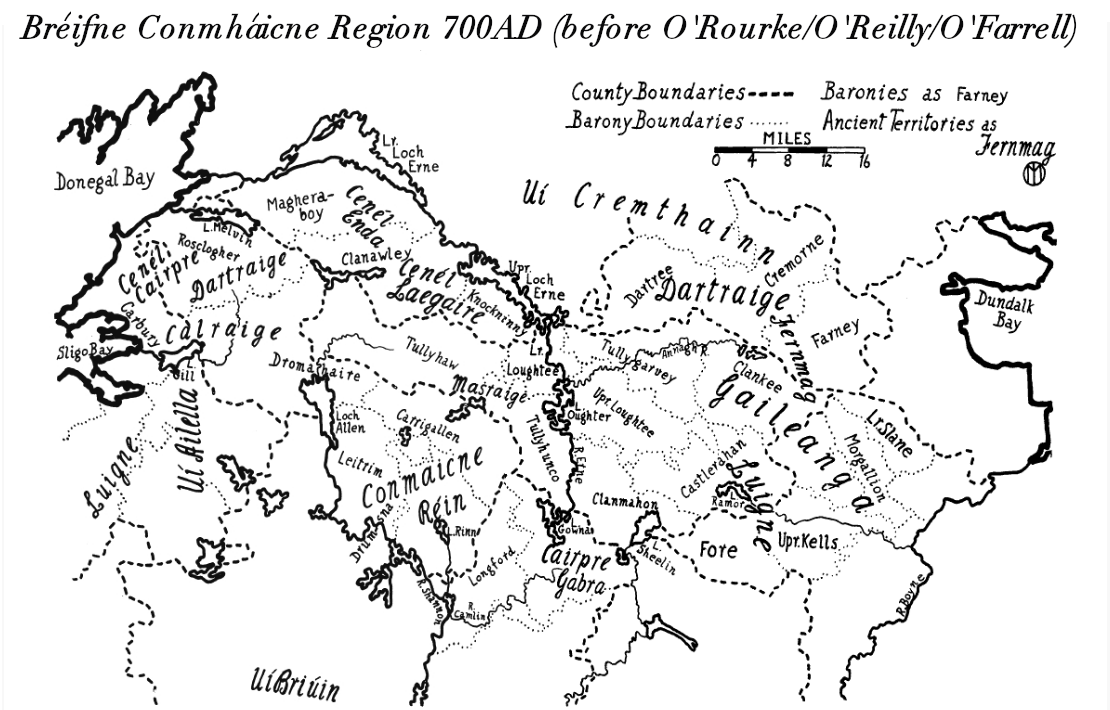
Map of Breifne in AD 700; Tullygarvey is seen in the centre.

Tullygarvey (Irish: Teallach Ghairbhíth) is one of eight Baronies in the County of Cavan. The area has been in constant occupation since pre-4000 BC. The Barony of Tullygarvey consists of the parishes of Kill and Drung and parts of Annagh, Drumgoon and Laragh.

Tullygarvey derives its name from the Irish meaning "Gairbhéith's household", Gairbhéith was a member of the Uí Briúin dynasty of Connacht. He was an ancestor of the O'Reilly clan and lived c.860 AD. He was not connected to the McGarvey clan of Donegal. It is located in the northeast of County Cavan, along the Annagh River.

== History ==
In 1579, East Breifne, then part of Connacht, was made a shire. The shire was named Cavan after the area's main town. The administration remained in the control of the local Irish dynasty and subject to the Brehon and Canon Law.

In 1584, Sir John Perrot formed the shire into a county in Ulster.

== Settlements ==
- Cootehill
