= Garvin =

- Language: Gaelic

Origin
- Meaning: "rough or cruel fate"
- Region of origin: Ireland; Scotland

Other names
- Variant forms: Garvey, Garvine, Garven, Garavin, Garvan, Girvin, Girwin, Garbhán (also with 'Mac' and 'O' prefixes)

Garvin is both a surname and a given name of Irish origin. Notable people with the name include:

Surname:

- Alexander Garvin (1941–2021), American urban planner, educator, and author
- Anita Garvin (1906–1994), American actress
- Clifton C. Garvin (1921–2016), former president and CEO of Exxon
- David A. Garvin (died 2017), American academic
- James Garvin (basketball) (born 1950), American basketball player
- James Louis Garvin (1868–1947), British journalist
- Jimmy Garvin (born 1952), former professional wrestler
- Jonathan Garvin (born 1999), American football player
- Lucius F. C. Garvin (1841–1922), former governor of Rhode Island
- Rex Garvin (1940–2013), American singer and musician
- Ron Garvin (born 1945), Canadian professional wrestler and referee
- Samuel B. Garvin (1811–1878), New York lawyer
- Stephen Garvin (1826–1874), Irish recipient of the Victoria Cross
- Ted Garvin (1923–1992), Canadian ice hockey coach
- Terence Garvin (born 1991), American football player
- Tom Garvin (1943–2024), Irish political scientist and historian
- Viola Garvin (1898–1968), English poet and editor

Given name:

- Garvin Alston (born 1971), Major League Baseball right-handed pitcher
- Garvin Bushell (1902–1991), American woodwind multi-instrumentalist
- Garvin Clarke (born 2001), Bahamian basketballer
- Garvin Cross (born 1970), stuntman and actor
- Garvin Roberts (born 1982), West Indian cricketer

Fictional characters:

- Willie Garvin, character in comic strip Modesty Blaise
- Fred Garvin, male prostitute
