= Garvin (disambiguation) =

Garvin is both a surname and a given name.

Garvin may also refer to:

== Places ==
- Garvin, Minnesota, United States
- Garvin, Oklahoma, United States
- Garvin County, Oklahoma, United States

== Other uses ==
- Thunderbird - The Garvin School of International Management
