= Nicholas F. Brady =

American politician (born 1930)

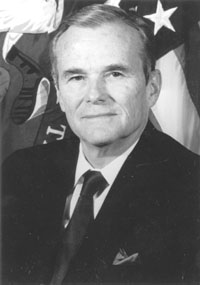
- Official portrait, circa 1988–93

68th United States Secretary of the Treasury
- In office September 15, 1988 – January 17, 1993
- President: Ronald Reagan; George H. W. Bush
- Preceded by: James Baker
- Succeeded by: Lloyd Bentsen

United States Senator from New Jersey
- In office April 12, 1982 – December 27, 1982
- Appointed by: Thomas Kean
- Preceded by: Harrison A. Williams
- Succeeded by: Frank Lautenberg

Personal details
- Born: Nicholas Frederick Brady; April 11, 1930 (age 96) New York City, New York, U.S.
- Party: Republican
- Spouse: Katherine Douglas (m. 1952; died 2021)
- Children: 4
- Education: Yale University (BA); Harvard University (MBA)

Nicholas Frederick Brady (born April 11, 1930) is an American banker and politician from New Jersey who briefly served in the United States Senate for eight months in 1982 and served as the 68th United States Secretary of the Treasury under U.S. Presidents Ronald Reagan and George H. W. Bush from 1988 to 1993. He is a member of the Republican Party.

In April 1982, he was appointed U.S. senator to finish the unexpired term of Harrison A. Williams, and did not seek election. As of 2026, Brady is the last Republican to serve in New Jersey's Class 1 U.S. Senate seat and is the oldest living former U.S. senator since the death of Daniel J. Evans.

As U.S. Secretary of the Treasury, Brady proposed and enacted a novel debt-reduction agreement for developing countries which became known as Brady Bonds.

== Early life ==
Brady was born on April 11, 1930 in Manhattan, New York City, the son of James Cox Brady Jr., and his wife, Eliot Chace. He was named for his paternal great-uncle, businessman and philanthropist Nicholas Frederic Brady. His great-grandfather was industrialist Anthony N. Brady. His father was a major figure in thoroughbred horse racing in the United States and Europe.

He grew up on an estate in Far Hills, New Jersey. After graduating from St. Mark's School in Southborough, Massachusetts, Brady attended Yale University (Bachelor of Arts, 1952), where he was a member of Chi Psi fraternity. He received his Master of Business Administration from Harvard University in 1954.

== Career ==
Brady's career in the banking industry spanned 34 years. He joined the now-defunct Dillon, Read & Co. in New York City in 1954, rising to chairman of the board in 1970.

He has been the Chairman of Darby Overseas Investments, Ltd. and Darby Technology Ventures Group, LLC, investment firms, since 1994. Mr. Brady is Chairman of Franklin Templeton Investment Funds (an international investment management company), a director of Hess Corporation (an exploration and production company) and Holowesko Partners Ltd. (investment management companies). He is also a director of the oilfield services company Weatherford International since 2004. He has been a director of the NCR Voyix, the Mitre Corporation, and Heinz, among others.

Brady is a former chairman of the boards of the now-defunct investment bank Dillon, Read & Co. (1970–1988) and Purolator Filters (1971–1987).

=== New Jersey politics and United States Senate appointment ===
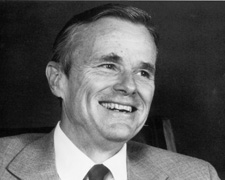
Nicholas F. Brady as U.S. senator

Brady served as the Republican committeeman of Somerset County, New Jersey. In 1981, he served as head of the transition team for Thomas Kean following Kean's election as Governor of New Jersey.

In 1982, Kean faced the duty of filling the vacant U.S. Senate Seat caused by the resignation of Senator Harrison A. Williams, following a planned expulsion vote in the wake of the Abscam. Williams delayed his resignation for ten months following his conviction for bribery, preventing Democratic governor Brendan Byrne from appointing a successor, until junior senator Bill Bradley announced he would vote for expulsion on March 10, 1982.

At the time of Williams' resignation, two Republican candidates, U.S. House of Representatives member Millicent Fenwick and conservative activist Jeff Bell, were already in the race for the next full term for the U.S. Senate. United States House of Representatives member Jim Courter also planned a campaign for Senate but ultimately chose not to run. After a month of deliberation and consulting with over one hundred state and local Republicans, Kean chose to remain neutral in the primary and appointed Brady as a caretaker.

Brady served from April 12, 1982 to December 27, 1982. During his time in the Senate, he was a member of the United States Senate Committee on Armed Services and the United States Senate Committee on Banking, Housing, and Urban Affairs. He resigned from office before the expiration of the term, so that Frank Lautenberg, the winner of the 1982 election, could enter the Senate early for purposes of seniority. In September 2024, he became the oldest living former U.S. senator following the death of Daniel J. Evans.

=== Advisor to Ronald Reagan ===
In 1984, Reagan appointed Brady to be Chairman of the President's Commission on Executive, Legislative and Judicial Salaries. He also served on the President's Commission on Strategic Forces (1983), the National Bipartisan Commission on Central America (1983), the Commission on Security and Economic Assistance (1983), and the Blue Ribbon Commission on Defense Management (1985). He also chaired the Presidential Task Force on Market Mechanisms in 1987.

=== Secretary of the Treasury ===
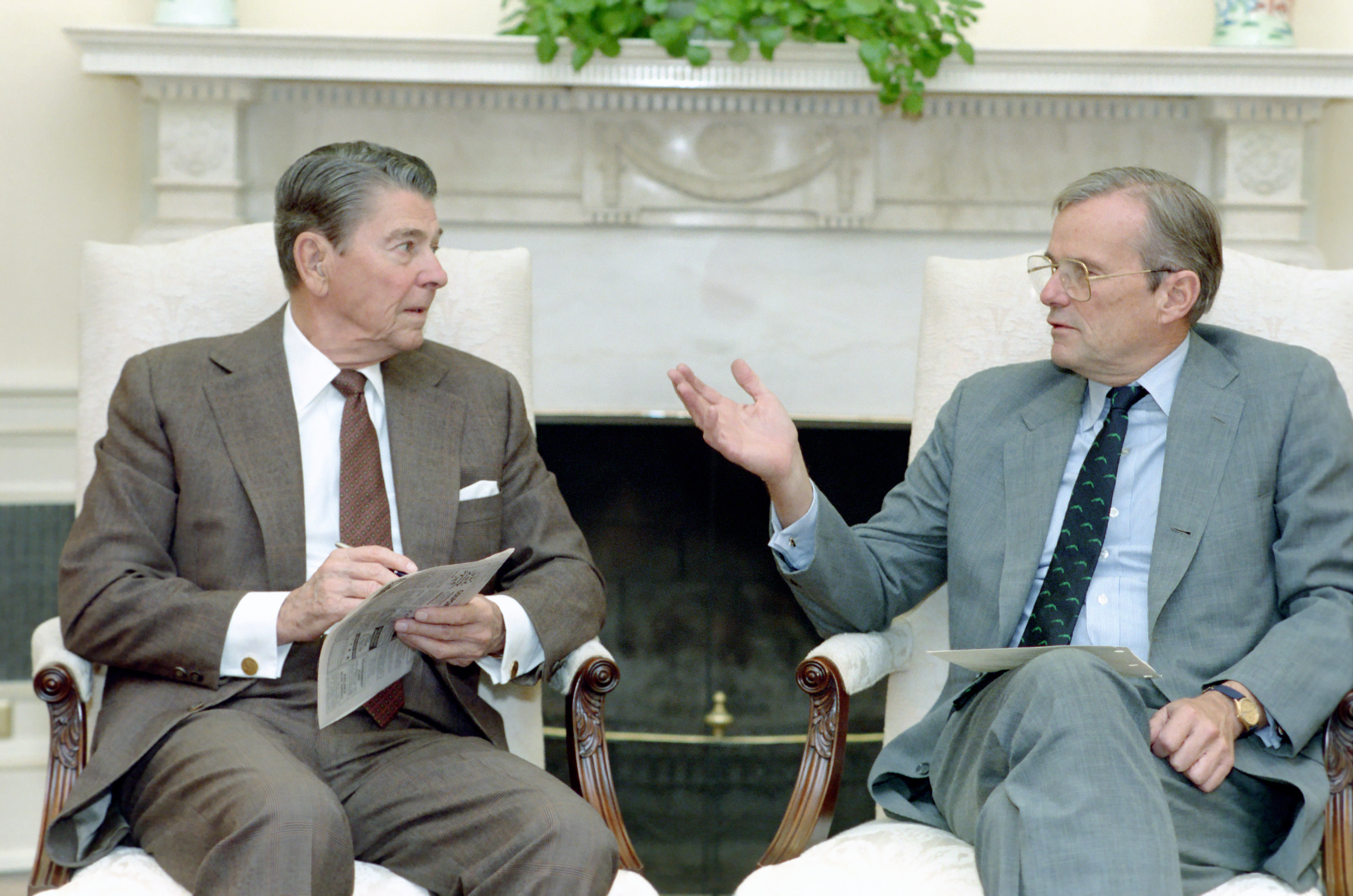
Brady with President Ronald Reagan in 1988

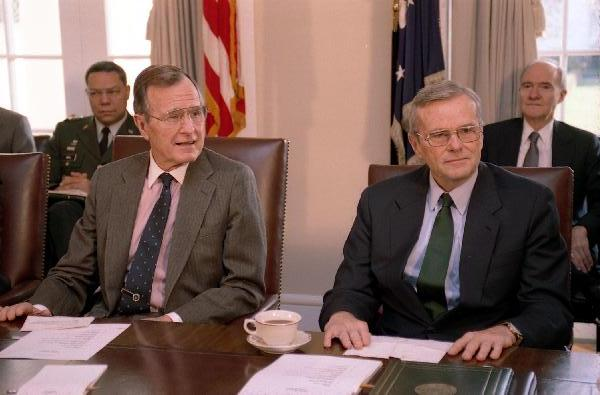
Brady with President George H. W. Bush in 1992

Brady became the 68th United States Secretary of the Treasury on September 15, 1988, and served during the last four months of Reagan's presidency and throughout the George H. W. Bush administration. In 1989, after a period of years in which a number of developing countries, including Mexico, defaulted on their external debt, he developed the Brady Plan to help them sell United States dollar-denominated bonds. These became known as Brady Bonds.

Early in his tenure as Treasury Secretary, The New York Times wrote that Brady had a rocky start and was "bland on television and awkward as a public speaker." But as a close friend and advisor to President Bush he had considerable influence. Chuck Schumer of New York, who was a Democratic member of the United States House of Representatives at the time, expressed the prevailing view: "Is he the smartest guy in the world? No. Did he make some major screwups? Yes. But Brady is one of the few people in the Government trying to do real substance. On savings and loan, he stepped up to the plate and swung at balls. The same with the third world debt. I'm not sure I agree with his plan, but at least he tried to do something. So, in an Administration where so much seems aimed at image and hype, Brady does deserve a lot of credit."

He has also served as a trustee of Rockefeller University and a member of the Board of the Economic Club of New York. He is a member of the Council on Foreign Relations and a former member of the Steering Committee of the Bilderberg Meeting. He is a former trustee of the Boys & Girls Clubs of America of Newark, New Jersey. Brady received the Golden Plate Award of the American Academy of Achievement in 1977.

== Personal life ==
Brady married Katherine Douglas (known as Kitty, daughter of Percy Livingston Douglas, president of the Otis Elevator Company) in 1952, and they had four children and 13 grandchildren. Katherine Brady died on January 6, 2021 at age 89.

Although never involved with horse racing at the same level as his father, he served for a time as chairman of The Jockey Club. Mill House (Stable) is the nom de course for Brady's racing operation.

U.S. Senate
Preceded by Harrison A. Williams	U.S. Senator (Class 1) from New Jersey; 1982; Served alongside: Bill Bradley	Succeeded by Frank Lautenberg
Political offices
Preceded by James Baker	United States Secretary of the Treasury; 1988–1993	Succeeded by Lloyd Bentsen
Honorary titles
Preceded by Daniel J. Evans	Oldest Living United States Senator (Sitting or former); 2024–present	Current holder
U.S. order of precedence (ceremonial)
Preceded by James H. Burnley IV as Former U.S. Cabinet Member	Order of precedence of the United States as Former U.S. Cabinet Member	Succeeded by Samuel K. Skinner as Former U.S. Cabinet Member
