= Anne Haney Cross =

American neurologist and neuroimmunologist (born c. 1956)

Anne Cross
- Born: c. 1956 (age 69–70); Mobile, Alabama
- Education: University of South Alabama; University of Alabama School of Medicine
- Known for: Implication of B cells in multiple sclerosis
- Awards: 2019 John Dystel Prize for Multiple Sclerosis Research, 2014 Faculty Achievement Award Washington University, 2010 President’s Achievement Award, Barnes-Jewish Hospital Foundation, 1990-1995 Harry Weaver Neuroscience Scholar of the National Multiple Sclerosis Society
- Scientific career
- Fields: Neurology, neuroimmunology
- Workplaces: Washington University School of Medicine

Anne Cross (born c. February 27, 1956) is an American neurologist and neuroimmunologist and the Section Head of Neuroimmunology at Washington University School of Medicine in St. Louis, Missouri. Cross holds the Manny and Rosalyn Rosenthal–Dr. John L. Trotter Endowed Chair in Neuroimmunology at Washington University in St. Louis School of Medicine and co-directs the John L Trotter Multiple Sclerosis Clinic at Barnes-Jewish Hospital. Cross is a leader in the field of neuroimmunology and was the first to discover the role of B cells in the pathogenesis of multiple sclerosis (MS) in animals and then in humans. Cross now develops novel imaging techniques to observe inflammation and demyelination in the central nervous systems of MS patients for diagnosis and disease management.

== Early life and education ==
Cross grew up in Mobile, Alabama. Cross pursued her undergraduate degree at the University of South Alabama in Mobile. She majored in chemistry and graduated summa cum laude with her Bachelors of Science in 1976. After completing her bachelor's degree, Cross pursued a medical degree at the University of Alabama School of Medicine in Birmingham, Alabama. Cross completed her medical training in 1980 and then pursued a residency in neurology at George Washington University School of Medicine in Washington, D.C. Cross completed her residency in 1984 and pursued further medical specialization through several fellowships. Cross first completed fellowship training in Neuroimmunology at the National Institutes of Health, in Bethesda Maryland.

After completing this training in 1986, Cross completed her next fellowship in the Department of Virology and Molecular Biology at St. Jude Children's Research Hospital in Memphis, Tennessee. Cross completed her final fellowship in Neuropathology in 1990 with the National Multiple Sclerosis Society at Albert Einstein College of Medicine in the Bronx, New York. Her education and training focused in neuroimmunology and the pathogenesis of multiple sclerosis set up Cross to merge her clinical and research careers in a translational and patient-directed way.

== Career and research ==
In 1990, Cross became an assistant professor of Neurology and Pathology at the Albert Einstein College of Medicine. She held this position for one year and was then recruited to Washington University in St. Louis where she became an associate professor of neurology with tenure. In 2003, Cross was named the Manny and Rosalyn Rosenthal-Dr. John L. Trotter MS Center Chair in Neuroimmunology within the Barnes-Jewish Hospital Foundation. She now is the co-director of the John L. Trotter MS Center at Washington University School of Medicine as well as the Section Head of Neuroimmunology. In addition to her faculty and research roles, Cross sees about 2000 patients annually who suffer from multiple sclerosis.

Cross is the principal investigator of the Cross Lab where she explores the pathogenesis of demyelination and inflammation in the central nervous system with a specific focus on the mechanisms of multiple sclerosis and the development of novel diagnostic and therapeutic techniques. The lab currently focuses on developing novel imaging techniques to differentiate between different types of demyelinating and inflammatory diseases of the central nervous system. Cross also focuses on the effects of the diet and calorie restriction on brain inflammation.

=== B cells in multiple sclerosis ===
Early in Cross's career, there was a debate regarding the role of B cells in the pathogenesis of multiple sclerosis. Cross sought to settle the debate concerning the role of B cells in MS and showed, in 1999, that B cells in fact play a major role of the pathogenesis of the disease. When a large polypeptide is used to induce experimental allergic encephalomyelitis (EAE), a model of MS in animals, B cells are critical to initiating the onset of disease. This process is thought to be similar to the onset of autoimmune disease in humans when a complex protein antigen is the stimulus for the autoimmune response. They further found that B cells are not critical for the induction of an autoimmune response by small peptides which might explain the previous debates and discrepancies in results concerning the role of B cells in EAE and MS. Cross then sought to determine a way to target B cells as a means of treatment for MS. She used rituximab, a monoclonal antibody that targets CD20, to deplete B cells and observed that depletion of B cells abrogated disease and reduced T cell infiltration of the central immune system. Cross elucidated that Rituximab is an effective treatment for MS in humans through modulation of B cells, though the exact mechanisms are still to be determined. To determine what the optimal response to rituximab therapy is, Cross looked at the tissue biomarkers of patients with multiple sclerosis on rituximab therapy. She found that rituximab therapy led to decreased markers of inflammation and higher IgG and CXCL13 in the cerebrospinal fluid of patients when successful.

=== Imaging techniques for multiple sclerosis ===
In order to track demyelinating diseases and diagnose them in patients, Cross began exploring various imaging techniques as a means to diagnose inflammatory and demyelinating disease. She found that diffusion tensor imaging (DTI) was a useful tool for observing demyelination in patients and could serve as a tool to detect axon injury and guide therapies. Cross also has used DTI to detect acute optic neuritis, since axial diffusivity can serve as a marker of axon injury in white matter. Cross later found that DTI could also be used to effectively detect spinal cord tissue injury as well in ms and neuromyelitis optica. An important breakthrough that Cross and her colleagues made recently was discovering that gradient echo MRI can be used to reliably assess cortical gray matter damage, a common finding in MS patients. With these novel imaging techniques, Cross has enabled the field with the ability to track disease course in human patients which will improve understanding of disease progress in a non-invasive way.

=== Diet and neuroimmune disease ===
Cross, in collaboration with a former mentee Laura Piccio, have been elucidating the impacts of diet on multiple sclerosis and CNS inflammation. They have previously found that calorie restriction abrogates EAE symptoms in animal models. Specifically, they found that intermittent fasting in mice with EAE had increases microbial diversity. The immunomodulatory effects of intermittent fasting suggest that it could pose as a potential therapy for MS.

== Awards and honors ==
- 2019 John Dystel Prize for Multiple Sclerosis Research
- 2014 Faculty Achievement Award Washington University
- 2010 President's Achievement Award, Barnes-Jewish Hospital Foundation
- 2007-2017 selected as one of “Best Doctors in America”
- 2006 selected to “Hall of Fame” for Researchers by National MS Society
- 1996 elected to American Neurological Association
- 1990-1995 Harry Weaver Neuroscience Scholar of the National Multiple Sclerosis Society
- 1973 National Merit Scholarship Recipient
- 1972 United States Presidential Scholar

== Select publications ==
- Xiang, B., Wen, J., Lu, H.-C., Schmidt, R.E., Yablonskiy, D.A. and Cross, A.H. (2020), In vivo evolution of biopsy-proven inflammatory demyelination quantified by R2t* mapping. Ann Clin Transl Neurol. doi:10.1002/acn3.51052
- B Cells, T Cells and Inflammatory CSF Biomarkers in Primary Progressive MS and Relapsing MS in the OBOE (Ocrelizumab Biomarker Outcome Evaluation) Trial (1635). Amit Bar-Or, Jeffrey Bennett, H. Von Budingen, Robert Carruthers, Keith Edwards, Robert Fallis, Damian Fiore, Jeffrey Gelfand, Paul Giacomini, Benjamin Greenberg, David Hafler, Erin Longbrake, Beverly Assman, Carolina Ionete, Ulrike Kaunzner, Christopher Lock, Xiaoye Ma, Bruno Musch, Gabriel Pardo, Jinglan Pei, Fredrik Piehl, Martin Weber, Tjalf Ziemssen, Ann Herman, Christopher Harp, Anne Cross. Neurology Apr 2020, 94 (15 Supplement) 1635
- Cross, Anne & Naismith, Robert. (2017). Refining the use of MRI to predict multiple sclerosis. The Lancet Neurology. 17. 10.1016/S1474-4422(17)30459-3.
- Alvarez EE, Piccio L, Mikesell RJ, Trinkaus K, Parks BJ, Naismith RT, Cross AH. Predicting optimal response to B cell depletion with rituximab in Multiple Sclerosis using CXCL13 index, MRI and clinical measures. Mult Scler J: Exp, Transl Clin 2015 DOI: 10.1177/2055217315623800
- Naismith RT, Piccio L, Lyons JA, Lauber J, Tutlam NT, Parks BJ, Trinkaus K, Song SK, Cross AH: Rituximab add-on therapy for breakthrough relapsing multiple sclerosis: a 52-week phase II trial. Neurology 2010; 74: 1860-1867 PMCID: PMC2882224
- Piccio LM, Buonsanti C, Schmidt RE, Rinker J, PaninaBordignon P, Cella M, Colonna M, Cross AH: Identification of a novel soluble TREM-2 protein in the cerebrospinal fluid in 7 association with central nervous system inflammation. Brain 2008; 131: 3081-3091 PMCID: PMC2577803
- Attarian HP, Brown KM, Duntley SP, Cross AH: The relationship of sleep disturbances to fatigue in multiple sclerosis. Arch. Neurol. 2004; 61: 535–538.
- Lyons JA, San M, Happ MP, and Cross AH: B-cells are critical to induction of experimental allergic 6 encephalomyelitis by protein but not by a short encephalitogenic peptide. Eur. J. Immunol.1999; 29: 3432-3439
- Cross AH, Manning PT, Stern MK, and Misko TP. Evidence for the production of peroxynitrite in inflammatory CNS demyelination. J. Neuroimmunol. 1997; 80:121-130
- Cross AH, Misko TP, Lin RF, Hickey WF, Trotter JL, Tilton RG: Aminoguanidine, an inhibitor of inducible nitric oxide synthase, ameliorates experimental autoimmune encephalomyelitis. J Clin Invest 1994;93:2684-2690 PMCID: PMC294515
- Cross AH, Tuohy VK, Raine CS: Development of reactivity to new myelin antigens during relapsing autoimmune demyelination. Cell Immunol 1993;146:261-269
- Cross AH, Cannella B, Brosnan CF, Raine CS: Homing tocentral nervous system vasculature by antigen specific lymphocytes. I. Localization of 14C-labeled cells during acute, chronic and relapsing experimental allergic encephalomyelitis. Lab Invest 1990;63:162-170
