= Verna Cook Garvan =

Verna Cook Garvan (1910-1993) was a business woman and philanthropist in the state of Arkansas. Her main business holdings included the Wisconsin & Arkansas Lumber Company, and Malvern Brick and Tile Company. She is the founder and benefactor of Garvan Woodland Gardens in Hot Springs, Arkansas.

== Early life ==
Garvan was born Verna Cook in Groveton, Texas, in 1910. She was the daughter of Arthur Bacillus Cook and Essie Louise Bordis Cook, and had one sister, Dorothy. The Cook family relocated to Malvern, Arkansas, in 1916, where the girls were primarily raised. Arthur Cook managed the Wisconsin & Arkansas Lumber Company and later Malvern Brick and Tile, and consequently exposed Verna to business matters at a young age. For secondary education Verna and Dorothy attended Holton-Arms girls' school in Washington, D.C.

== Personal life ==
Shortly after her father died in a tragic car accident, Verna Cook wed Alonzo "Lonnie" B. Alexander on October 1, 1934. Fourteen years her senior, Alexander was a United States Naval Academy graduate and member of a prominent business family in Spartanburg, South Carolina. The couple relocated to South Carolina and had one son, Arthur Cook Alexander. Arthur was born with cystic fibrosis and his health demanded great attention from his mother to manage his care. During a period of marital discord Verna moved to Florida with Arthur, believing it would aid his poor health. Arthur did not fare well in the Florida climate and eventually left his mother to attend school in Arizona for its drier climate. He remained in Arizona until his death in November 1954. In 1956, Verna's marriage to Lonnie Alexander ended in divorce, after two years of legal proceedings regarding Verna's stake in her late father's business holdings.

Following the death of her son and dissolution of her marriage to Lonnie Alexander, the future Verna Garvan returned to her home in Malvern. She continued to lead management of the Cook family's businesses and soon met her second husband, Patrick Garvan, Jr. The couple wed on June 29, 1960 and chose to remain in Hot Springs where they met. Patrick Garvan's family was socially prominent in New York City, and his parents Francis Patrick Garvan, Sr. and Mabel Brady Garvan donated a significant collection of art and antiques to Yale University. Verna and Patrick planned to build a home on what is now the grounds of Garvan Woodland Gardens, but very little had been constructed when Patrick died in 1972. Garvan remained unmarried and continued her horticultural work, leaving a legacy of nature and education for the people of Arkansas.

== Career ==
Garvan expressed interest in her father's business ventures as a child. After the death of her father, and her marriage to Lonnie Alexander, Verna took the lead in family business matters involving her father's company, the A. B. Cook Company. Her mother and sister hesitated to involve themselves in the businesses or let Verna manage them. Despite their concerns and her relocation to South Carolina, Verna Cook Alexander was able to run both Wisconsin & Arkansas Lumber, and Malvern Brick and Tile from afar through a hired manager. She later turned over the management of the businesses to her husband. During her divorce from Alexander, Verna fought for her business interests in Arkansas and maintained control of Malvern Brick and Tile. She returned to her home in Arkansas and continued to manage Malvern Brick and Tile until it was sold to Acme Brick in the 1970s. Garvan's personal corporation, ABCO, was dissolved after her death

== Alexander v. Alexander ==
During the dissolution of their marriage, Lonnie Alexander and Verna became entangled in a lawsuit over business investments. Alexander claimed to own a majority stake in the Cook's family business. This fact was disputed by Verna, her mother, and her sister Dorothy, all of whom were vying for their own interests. Eventually Verna convinced her family to sever ties with Alexander and worked to settle the financial fallout.

The legal battle intensified in January 1954, after Garvan's relocation to Florida. Lonnie attempted to have Verna committed to a psychiatric ward in Florida. He filed a petition against her and deputy sheriffs took her into custody. After being held without access to a telephone for three days, Garvan reached out to her friend Richard C. Butler. Butler was a prominent Little Rock attorney and successfully aided in the release of Garvan from the psychiatric facility. The courts later found her to be mentally competent and Alexander's charge without merit. Ultimately the court ruled in Verna's favor, returning her business assets.

In October 1952, Verna filed for divorce, but was denied based on Arkansas's lack of jurisdiction. This was followed by a divorce suit filed by Lonnie in South Carolina in October 1953, which included charges of slander, missing property, and failure to pay salaries. During this time their son Arthur's health declined and Verna left to be by his side in Arizona. Arthur died in November 1954, and year later the economic charges were settled and their divorce was finalized.

== Garvan Woodland Gardens ==
Beginning in 1956, Garvan began landscaping and construction on family property in Hot Springs. Continuing work during her marriage to Patrick Garvan, Verna's plan was to create a home set on a beautifully landscaped lot along the shoreline of Lake Hamilton. After Patrick's death, Garvan gave up her plans to build a house on the property. With the help of Acme Brick superintendent Warren Bankson and his assembled work crews, she was able to continue her landscaping project.

After a significant amount of work was completed on the property Verna sought a benefactor that would agree to maintain the grounds after her death. This led her to create an endowment agreement with the University of Arkansas that remains in effect under the Fay Jones School of Architecture. One major landscape architecture component completed prior to Garvan's death is known as the Verna Cook Garvan Pavilion, co-designed by famed architect E. Fay Jones.
