= McGarvie =

McGarvie is a surname. Notable people with the surname include:

- Blythe McGarvie, president and CEO of Leadership for International Finance, LLC
- John McGarvie (1795–1853), Scottish-born Australian Presbyterian minister and writer
- Richard McGarvie (1926–2003), judge in the Supreme Court of Victoria and Governor of Victoria 1992–1997
- William McGarvie (1810–1841), Scottish-born bookseller and newspaper owner, active in New South Wales

== See also ==
- McGarvie Model, proposition for change to the Australian Constitution to remove references to the monarchy and establish a republic
- McGarvey, another surname
