= Thomas Bowman Garvie =

English painter

Thomas Bowman Garvie (6 February 1859 – 5 January 1944) was a Northumbrian artist whose portraits include Thomas Burt, Lord Percy, Lord Armstrong, George B Bainbridge, Fred B Fenwick and Sir William and Lady Grey.

He was a prolific painter of portraits and landscapes. He studied in London and Paris completing the Grand Tour in 1898. His work faithfully observed nature: landscapes were painted plein air and his portraits and figurative paintings reflect a naturalistic use of light and colour. Despite his orthodox outlook, he was at the time an extremely popular portraitist of the North East and there are several of his paintings in the Laing Art Gallery, Newcastle and Cragside (National Trust) in Northumberland.

== Biography ==
Bowman Garvie was born in Morpeth, Northumberland. He showed an early talent for drawing and was successful in gaining a place to study under Philip Hermogenes Calderon in 1883 obtaining there a scholarship for the Royal Academy where he studied until 1888 when he travelled to Paris to study at the Académie Julian under Fleury and William-Adolphe Bouguereau. For the next ten years he spent long periods painting in France, Italy and Switzerland before returning to Morpeth in 1898 to marry his long standing fiancé Isabella Grey.

Between 1914 and 1922 he held the position of Master of the Pictures at the Pen and Palette Club in Newcastle; a member of the Cullercoats Art Group; President of the North East Coast Art Club in 1937 and a member of the Art Committee, Kings College, Newcastle.

== Legacy ==
Garvie has over twenty paintings in British public collections.
