= Michael Saag =

American researcher (born 1955)

Michael S. Saag (born October 2, 1955) is a physician and prominent HIV/AIDS researcher at the University of Alabama at Birmingham (UAB). He holds the Jim Straley Chair in AIDS Research, is Director of the Division of Infectious Disease and of the William C. Gorgas Center for Geographic Medicine, and is Director of the Center for AIDS Research. He is also the founder of the 1917 Clinic, a comprehensive AIDS treatment and research center at UAB Saag is a frequent lecturer at AIDS conferences around the world and is credited with performing pioneering clinical trials for several antiretroviral drugs now in common use for HIV treatment and for first demonstrating the clinical value of "viral-load testing" in HIV/AIDS treatment. In 2009 Saag was elected chairman of the HIV Medicine Association of the Infectious Diseases Society of America. In 2019 Saag began serving on the Presidential Advisory Council on HIV/AIDS.

Saag appeared in the 2001 PBS documentary Evolution describing how HIV can evolve to newer drug-resistant strains in the course of hours. He is co-author of a 2007 textbook, AIDS Therapy and editor of the Sanford Guide to Antimicrobial Therapy and the Sanford Guide to HIV/AIDS Therapy. On April 14, 2014, Saag released his first book Positive published by Greenleaf Book Group, LLC.

== Personal life ==
Saag was born in Louisville, Kentucky. He graduated from Ballard High School in 1973 and was a three-year starter at offensive guard and defensive tackle for the Bruins football team. He completed an undergraduate degree in chemistry at Tulane University in 1977. He was also president of Zeta Beta Tau fraternity and was a creative film maker while at the university.

He graduated from medical school at the University of Louisville and completed his residency in internal medicine and a fellowship in infectious diseases at UAB.

Dr. Saag is married to Amy Weil Saag. His children are Andrew, Harry, and Julie.

In March 2020, Dr. Saag contracted (and ultimately recovered from) COVID-19. Since his recovery, Dr. Saag has spoken out publicly about the need to wear masks and maintain social distancing.
