= Marie-Carmelle Elie =

American emergency physician

- Education: Columbia University; State University of New York; Mount Sinai Health System
- Scientific career
- Workplaces: University of Florida; R Adams Cowley Shock Trauma Center; University of Alabama at Birmingham

Marie-Carmelle Elie (born October 12, 1973) is an American emergency physician who is a Professor of Emergency Medicine at the University of Alabama at Birmingham. She was elected Fellow of the National Academy of Medicine in 2022.

== Early life and education ==
Elie was undergraduate student at Columbia University, where she majored in biology and chemistry. During her undergraduate studies, she was awarded a scholarship to work on vitamin A. Her research looked to identify ways to measure vitamin A in humans, and to understand why certain HIV-positive mothers translated the virus to their babies. She showed that nutrition was critical in the transfer of HIV. She moved to the State University of New York for her medical degree. Elie focused on emergency medicine for her residency, and worked in the Mount Sinai Health System. She was made Chief Resident, and realized that she could have a profound impact on culture and patient care. She was on the critical care team at the R Adams Cowley Shock Trauma Center.

== Research and career ==
Elie started her medical career at the University of Medicine and Dentistry of New Jersey. She developed the departmental strategy on emergency medicine and critical care. She has searched for biomarkers that present in critical care patients who experience complications. She has looked for biomarkers that can indicate pediatric sepsis. Alongside investigating biomarkers, Elie led clinical trials, with a focus on acute respiratory distress syndrome.

In 2010, Elie joined the University of Florida, where she developed an alert system to streamline and prevent errors in the critical care system. Elie chaired the sepsis committee at the University of Florida, and established the emergency room sepsis alert. During the COVID-19 pandemic, Elie switched focus to identify treatments for COVID-19, and identified that a 2-drug strategy (baricitinib plus remdesivir) can improve patient outcomes.

In 2020, Elie was appointed a professor and served as the Chair in the Department of Emergency Medicine from 2020-2025. She is the first Black woman to hold such a position at a major American medical school. She was elected Fellow of the National Academy of Medicine in 2022.

== Selected publications ==
- Andre C Kalil; Thomas F Patterson; Aneesh K Mehta; et al. (11 December 2020). "Baricitinib plus Remdesivir for Hospitalized Adults with Covid-19". The New England Journal of Medicine. 384 (9): 795–807. doi:10.1056/nejmoa2031994. ISSN 0028-4793. PMC 7745180. PMID 33306283. Wikidata Q104166326.
- John H Beigel; Evgenia Aga; Marie-Carmelle Elie-Turenne; et al. (30 September 2019). "Anti-influenza immune plasma for the treatment of patients with severe influenza A: a randomised, double-blind, phase 3 trial". The Lancet. Respiratory medicine. 7 (11): 941–950. doi:10.1016/s2213-2600(19)30199-7. ISSN 2213-2600. PMC 6941345. PMID 31582360. Wikidata Q90465416.
- John H Beigel; Yajing Bao; Joy Beeler; et al. (22 September 2017). "Oseltamivir, amantadine, and ribavirin combination antiviral therapy versus oseltamivir monotherapy for the treatment of influenza: a multicentre, double-blind, randomised phase 2 trial". Lancet Infectious Diseases. doi:10.1016/s1473-3099(17)30476-0. ISSN 1473-3099. PMC 5777222. PMID 28958678. Wikidata Q41928469.

== Personal life ==
Elie is married to a pro tennis coach, with whom she has two children.
