= W. Timothy Garvey =

American endocrinologist

W. Timothy Garvey is an American endocrinologist and Butterworth Professor of Medicine in the department of Nutrition Sciences at the University of Alabama School of Medicine. He is known for his work on diabetes and is director of the medical school's Diabetes Research Center.

== Education ==
- 1974 – B.A., Washington University in St. Louis
- 1978 – M.D., Washington University School of Medicine
- 1982-1983 – Clinical and Research Fellow, University of Colorado
- 1983-1984 – Clinical and Research Fellow, University of California
