= Garvan Woodland Gardens =

Gardens in Hot Springs, Arkansas, U.S.

Coordinates: 34.4347°N 93.0456°W

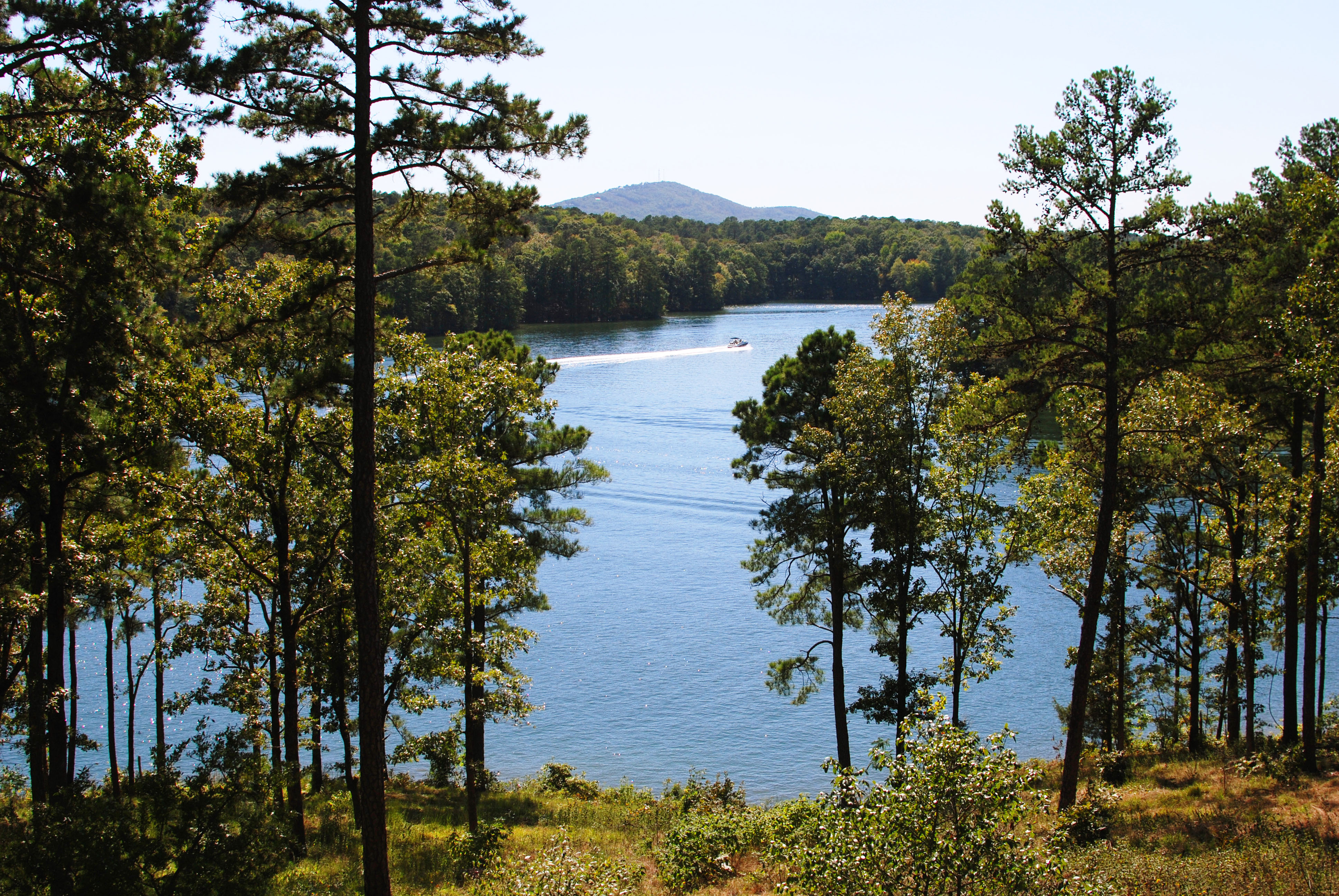
Hot Springs' Lake Hamilton, viewed from a Garvan Woodland Gardens trail

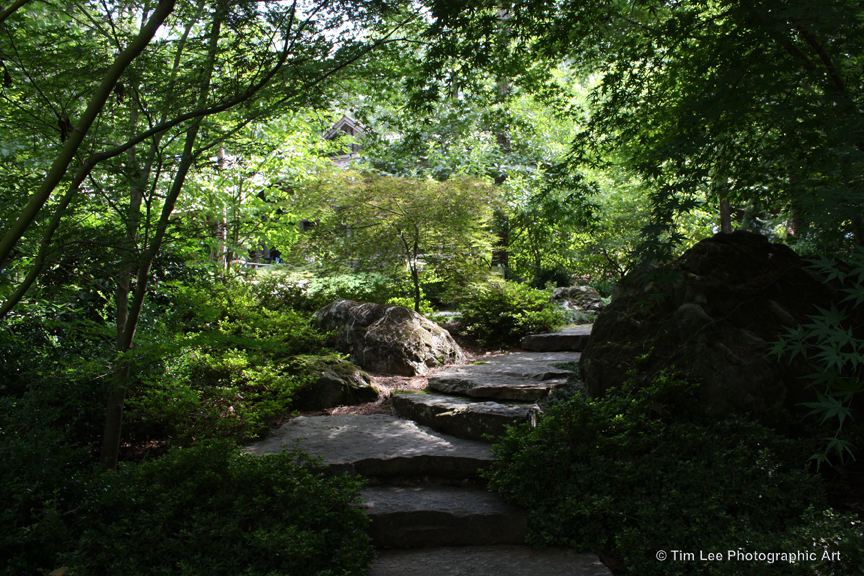
Garvan Woodland Gardens' Japanese Garden

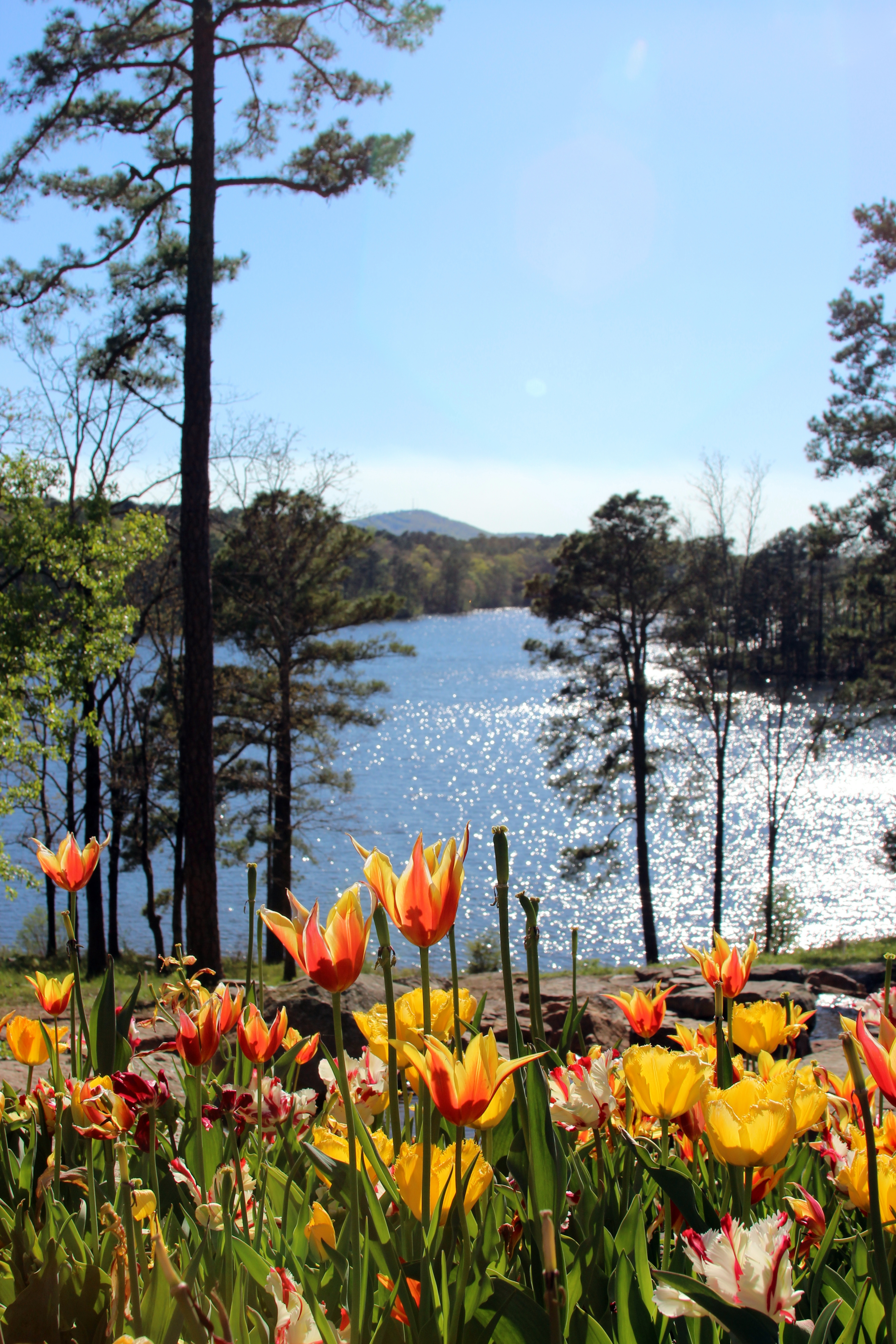

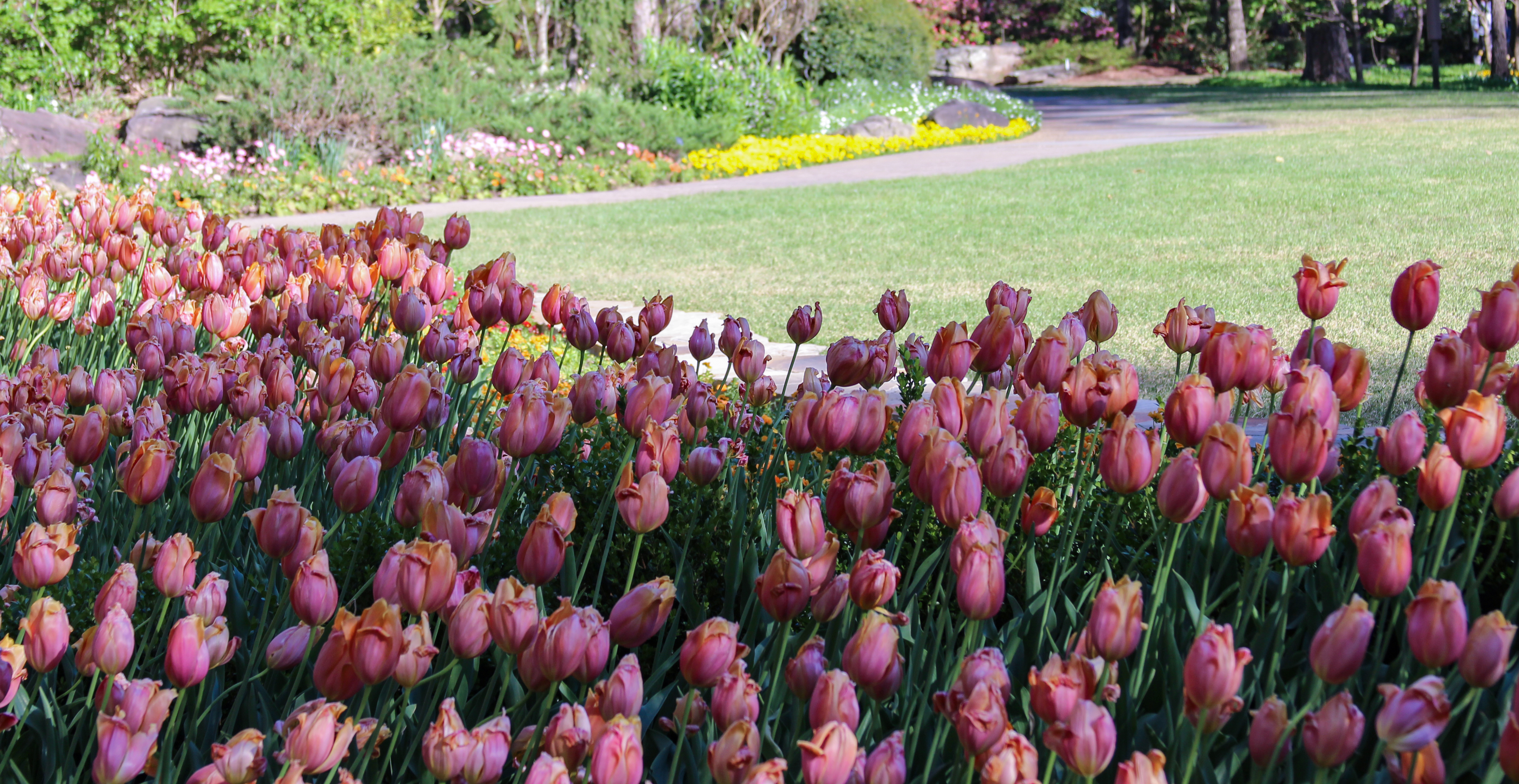
Pink Tulips at Garvan Woodland Gardens. The tulips are very abundant every spring.

Garvan Woodland Gardens is a 210-acre (85 ha) botanical garden and woodland garden located at 550 Arkridge Road, approximately 6 miles from Hot Springs National Park in Hot Springs, Arkansas, United States. Owned by the University of Arkansas, it has the stated mission of education, research and public service. For an admission fee, it is open daily, except on Thanksgiving Day, Christmas Day and the month of January.

Garvan Woodland Gardens is situated on a woodland peninsula with 4.5 miles (7 km) of shoreline on Lake Hamilton. It features rocky inclines reminiscent of the surrounding Ouachita Mountains, floral landscapes, streams, and waterfalls in a natural woodland setting, plus the fifth-ranked Garden of the Pine Wind Japanese Garden with Japanese maples and tree peonies, a conifer border, and various flower and rock gardens. Its collections display hundreds of rare shrubs and trees, including camellias, magnolias, roses and more than 160 different types of azaleas.

== History ==
The garden site was clear-cut around 1915. It was purchased by the Arthur B. Cook family of Malvern, Arkansas, in the 1920s. Arthur B. Cook operated Wisconsin-Arkansas Lumber Company and Malvern Brick and Tile Company until his premature death in 1934. Shortly afterward, a daughter, Verna Cook Garvan, assumed control of the A.B. Cook companies as one of the first female chief executive officers of a major southern manufacturing business. She served as CEO until her retirement in the 1970s.

A self-taught gardener, Verna Cook Garvan began to develop the site in 1956 as a garden and possible future homesite. Over the next 40 years, she planted thousands of specimens. She was intimately familiar with site and laid out each path. She personally chose each new plant and selected its location.

Upon her death in 1993, Mrs. Garvan left the property to the Department of Landscape Architecture of the University of Arkansas, through the University of Arkansas Foundation. The department is now an independent department within the Fay Jones School of Architecture and Design.

Fay Jones, winner of the American Institute of Architects' Gold Medal and first dean of the University of Arkansas School of Architecture, co-designed Verna Cook Garvan Pavilion, which sits in the center of the original plantings.

== See also ==
- List of botanical gardens in the United States
- Verna Cook Garvan Papers. Department of Landscape Architecture. University of Arkansas at Fayetteville, Fayetteville, Arkansas.
