= Garvin Roberts =

Grenadian cricketer (born 1982)

Personal information
- Full name: Garvin Raphael Roberts
- Born: 10 December 1982 (age 43); Saint George Parish, Grenada
- Batting: Left-handed
- Bowling: Right-arm medium

Domestic team information
- Years: Team
- 2009: Windward Islands
- Source: CricketArchive, 24 February 2016

Garvin Raphael Roberts (born 10 December 1982) is a Grenadian cricketer who has played for the Windward Islands in West Indian domestic cricket. He plays as a left-handed top-order batsman.

Roberts was born in St. Paul's, in Grenada's Saint George Parish. He made his first-class debut for the Windwards in January 2009, playing against Guyana in the 2008–09 Regional Four Day Competition. Roberts came in third in the batting order on debut, scoring three runs in the Windward Islands' only innings. He was retained for the following game, against Barbados, but scored only 12 runs in the first innings and one in the second, and was subsequently dropped. He has not played for the Windwards since.
