= Inisfada =

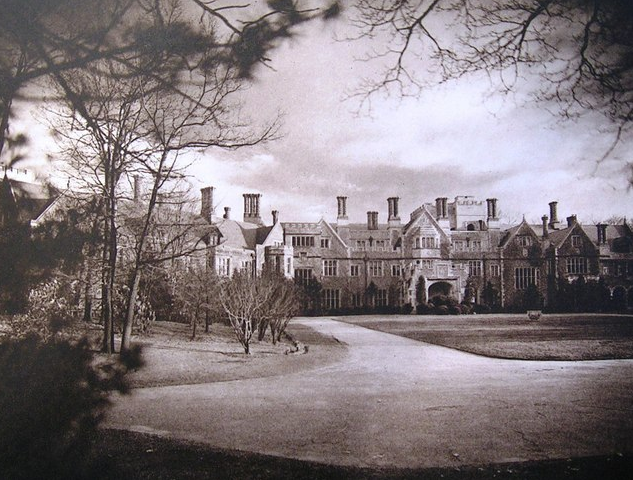
- The mansion before its demolition in 2013
- Interactive map of the Inisfada area
- Alternative names: St. Ignatius Retreat House

General information
- Status: Demolished
- Type: Mansion
- Architectural style: Tudor Revival
- Location: North Hills, New York, United States
- Coordinates: 40°47′07.0″N 73°39′59.2″W
- Completed: 1920
- Demolished: December 2013
- Client: Nicholas & Genevieve Brady

Design and construction
- Architect: John T. Windrim

Inisfada was the North Hills, Long Island estate of Nicholas Frederic Brady and Genevieve Brady (née Garvan), an American papal duke and duchess. Nicholas Brady was a convert from Episcopalianism to Catholicism and built the mansion as his family residence. Completed in 1920, the home was later given to the Jesuits who used the building as a seminary and later as the St. Ignatius Retreat House. The property was sold in May 2013 to developers, and the house was demolished in December 2013.

== History ==
The mansion was built from 1916 to 1920 and cost over $2 million. It was designed by noted Philadelphia architect John T. Windrim. The mansion possessed 87 rooms and was built on an estate originally encompassing 300 acres.

As noted by The New York Times and Newsday, the house was used as a residence by visiting Catholic dignitaries, including Eugenio Pacelli (the future Pope Pius XII) as a Vatican diplomat in 1936.

The name Inisfada is Irish for "Long Island". The house was one of the largest of the "Gold Coast" mansions on the North Shore of Long Island and was once the fourth-largest mansion in the United States.

=== Jesuit use ===
After the death of the duchess (who had no children) in 1938, Inisfada was willed to the New York Province of the Catholic Society of Jesus (Jesuit) order for their use; they ran a retreat house (known as the St. Ignatius Retreat House) there starting in 1963. Prior to 1963, the Jesuits used the property as a seminary.

On June 21, 2012, according to the National Catholic Reporter, the provincial of the Jesuits (Fr. David Ciancimino) announced by letter that Inisfada and another local Jesuit retreat house, the Mount Manresa Jesuit Retreat House in Staten Island, would be closed on June 1, 2013. The letter noted "The model of maintaining retreat houses is no longer financially viable or consistent with this new vision", and advocated "that we become more flexible and agile in the ways we share the Exercises". The closing process was the result of two years of discernment and study by "directors and board members of retreat centers, province leaders and many others."

Efforts and sustained protests were made to preserve the mansion by preservation groups and activists, including an unsuccessful effort by local government leaders to get landmark status for the building. A Manhasset civic organization called the Council of Greater Manhasset Civic Associations attempted to mount a grassroots campaign to save the building, including attempting to find an alternative buyer for the building in the Community Wellness Clinics of America, a Queens-based nonprofit health organization which claimed to be able to match other offers for the building. The Town of North Hempstead historian Howard Kroplick stated "It is another sad day for preserving Long Island's history. It is a shame that Village of North Hills officials, in the name of 'progress', made little attempt to save this historic and unique building."

=== Sale and demolition ===
The property was sold in May 2013 for $36.5 million to the Manhasset Bay Group, a consortium of four Hong Kong-based development companies. At the time of sale, the estate was only 33 acres (13 ha). The Jesuit retreat house closed in August. The last Mass was said at the retreat center on June 2, 2013. The Saint Genevieve chapel, one of the main chapels from the retreat house, which contained intricate woodwork, was salvaged and is being stored under the care of Fordham University. Starting in 2025, Fordham University and the Jesuit Church started to sell off pieces of the historic Saint Genevieve Chapel, contradicting their earlier plans to restore it on campus. Chapel elements for sale as per private sale advertisement by sothebys auction house.

The property was valued at the time of sale at $44 million. Demolition of the mansion started on December 5, 2013. By December 6, 2013, Newsday reported that almost half of the mansion was demolished.

The Manhasset Bay Group plans to build a subdivision on the property, with 46 homes on lots ranging from a 0.5-acre (0.20 ha) to one acre in area. This subdivision underwent a hearing for environmental concerns in March 2016.
