= Eddie Garvie =

Scottish footballer

Personal information
- Full name: Edwin Stanley Garvey
- Date of birth: 14 September 1892
- Place of birth: Calton, Scotland
- Date of death: 15 October 1915 (aged 23)
- Place of death: Jülich, German Empire
- Positions: Half back; forward

Senior career*
Years	Team	Apps	(Gls)
1911–1914	Queen's Park	85	(7)
- * Club domestic league appearances and goals

Edwin Stanley Garvie (14 September 1892 – 15 October 1915) was a Scottish amateur football half back and forward who played in the Scottish League for Queen's Park. Garvie captained the club and at the time of his death in 1915, he was described by the Southern Press as the "best all-round player Queen's Park has known for many years.

== Personal life ==
Prior to the First World War, Garvie worked as a foreign merchants' clerk. After the outbreak of the war in August 1914, Garvie enlisted in the 5th Battalion of the Queen's Own Cameron Highlanders. Serving with the rank of lance corporal, On 25 September 1915, Garvie was wounded in the advance on the Hohenzollern Redoubt during the Battle of Loos. He was taken prisoner by the Germans and died of his wounds in a prison hospital in Jülich on 15 October 1915. His grave was later moved to the Südfriedhof in Cologne. Garvie's younger brother, Ernest, served as a second lieutenant in the Highland Light Infantry during the war and won the Military Cross. He was accidentally killed by a fellow officer during the Battle of the Lys in 1918.
