= Stephen Garvin =

Irish recipient of the Victoria Cross (1826–1874)

- Colour Sergeant Stephen Garvin
- Born: c. 1826; Cashel, County Tipperary
- Died: 23 November 1874; Chesterton, Cambridge
- Burial place: St. Andrew's Parish Churchyard, Chesterton
- Military career
- Allegiance: United Kingdom
- Branch: British Army
- Service years: 1844–1863
- Rank: Colour Sergeant
- Units: 1st Battalion 60th Rifles
- Conflicts: Second Anglo-Sikh War; Indian Mutiny; North-West Frontier
- Awards: Victoria Cross; Distinguished Conduct Medal

Stephen Garvin VC, DCM (c. 1826 – 23 November 1874), born in Cashel, County Tipperary, was an Irish recipient of the Victoria Cross, the highest award for gallantry in the face of the enemy that can be awarded to British and Commonwealth forces.

== Details ==
He was around 31 years old, and a colour-sergeant in the 1st Battalion, 60th Rifles, British Army during the Indian Mutiny when the following deed took place on 23 June 1857 at Delhi, India for which he was awarded the Victoria Cross:

For daring and gallant conduct before Delhi on the 23rd of June, 1857, in volunteering to lead a small party of men, under a heavy fire, to the "Sammy House," for the purpose of dislodging a number of the Enemy in position there, who kept up a destructive fire on the advanced battery of heavy guns, in which, after a sharp contest, he succeeded. Also recommended for gallant conduct throughout the operations before Delhi.

== Further information ==
=== Death ===
Garvin died in Chesterton, Cambridge on 23 November 1874, and is buried in St. Andrew's Parish Churchyard there.

=== Victoria Cross auctioning ===
His Victoria Cross is in private ownership, having been bought by Conservative peer Lord Ashcroft at auction in 2014.
