= John Garvey =

John Garvey may refer to:

- John Garvey (bishop) (1527–1595), Irish Protestant bishop of Kilmore and archbishop of Armagh
- John Garvey (rugby league) (born 1913), English rugby league footballer of the 1930s
- John Garvey (musician) (1921–2006), American orchestra leader and academic
- John Garvey (soccer) (born 1969), retired American soccer player
- John H. Garvey (born 1948), President of The Catholic University of America
