= McGarvey =

McGarvey is an Irish surname. Notable people with the surname include:

- Ayelish McGarvey, journalist covering the religious right
- Frank McGarvey (born 1956), Scottish football player
- John William McGarvey (1829–1911), minister and religious educator in the American Restoration Movement
- Robert N. McGarvey (1888–1952), Republican member of the U.S. House of Representatives from Pennsylvania
- Rosie Kane, née McGarvey (born 1961), Scottish politician
- Ryan McGarvey (born 1986), American blues rock singer, guitarist, and songwriter
- Scott McGarvey (born 1963), Scottish football player
- Seamus McGarvey (born 1967), Northern Ireland film director
- Stan McGarvey, American football coach
- William Henry McGarvey (1843–1914), Canadian oil magnate in Europe
- James McGarvey (born 1994), Gortin Co. Tyrone

== See also ==
- McGarvie, another surname
