= Nicholas Frederic Brady =

20th-century American businessman

- Duke of the Holy Roman Church
- Born: October 27, 1878; Albany, New York, United States
- Died: March 27, 1930 (aged 51); New York City
- Buried: Wernersville, Pennsylvania
- Spouse: Genevieve Garvan
- Father: Anthony N. Brady
- Mother: Marcia Ann Myers
- Occupation: Businessman

Nicholas Frederic Brady, Duke of the Holy Roman Church (October 27, 1878 – March 27, 1930) was a New York City businessman and philanthropist who was the first American to receive the Catholic honor, the Supreme Order of Christ. He was the holder of several papal honors, including being a papal duke ad personam (non-hereditary).

== Early life ==
Brady was born on October 27, 1878, in Albany, New York. His father was the industrialist Anthony N. Brady. He graduated from Yale University in 1899. He was raised an Episcopalian but converted to Catholicism.

== Career ==
Brady and his brother James Cox Brady, Sr., oversaw a vast business empire built by their father. James Brady died in 1927, and Nicholas continued running the businesses. He was Chairman of the board of directors of New York Edison Co. and a director of Anaconda Copper Mining Co., Westinghouse Electric, National City Bank, Union Carbide, and numerous other companies in the United States and Japan whose activities were primarily in utilities. The Brady brothers provided substantial funds to enable Walter Chrysler both to take over the ailing Maxwell Motor Company and to acquire Chrysler Corporation. Nicholas became a lifelong member of Chrysler's board of directors.

== Personal life ==
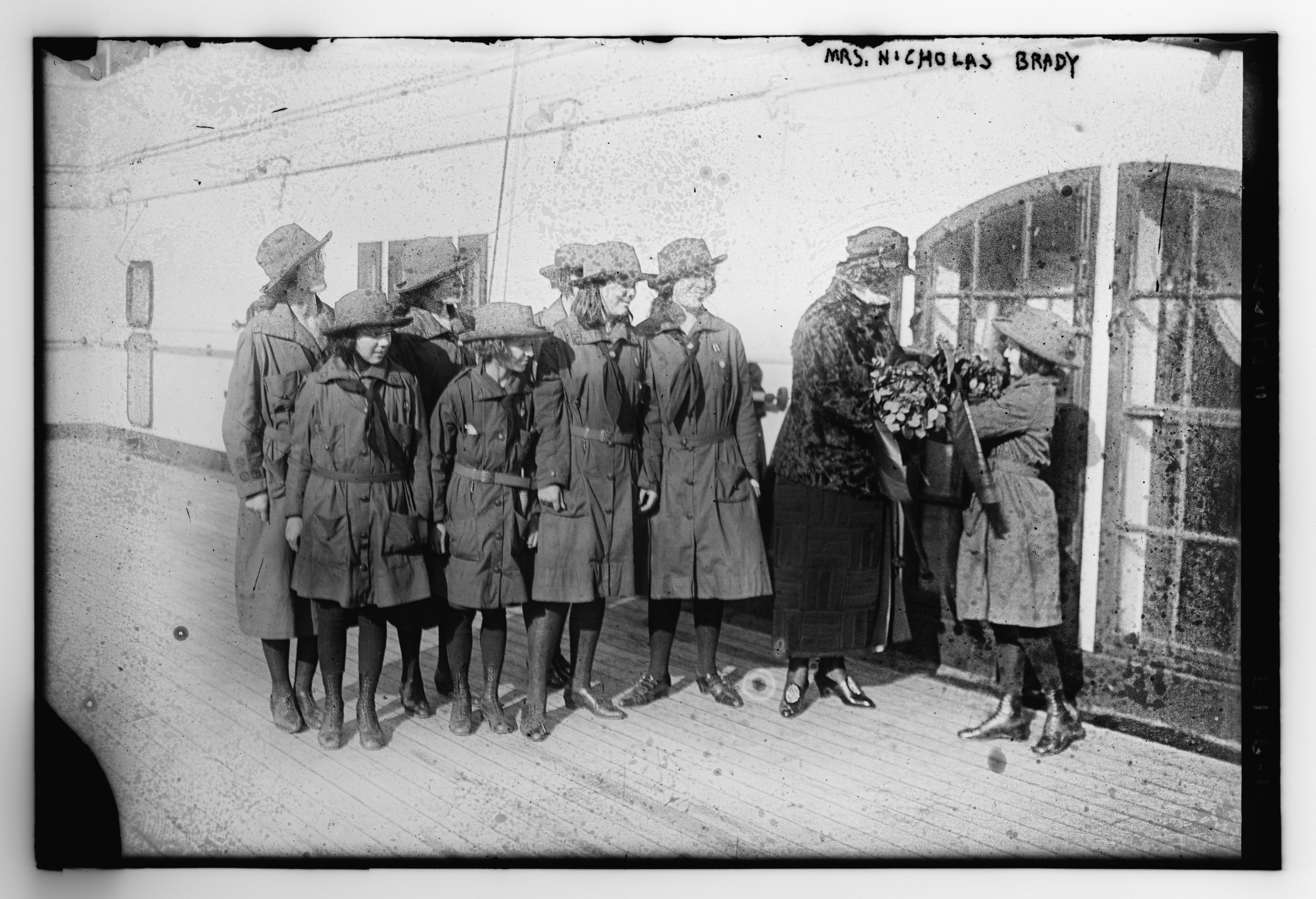
Genevieve Garvan Brady with Girl Scouts in 1924

Brady married Genevieve Garvan, sister of Francis Patrick Garvan. The couple had no children. A devout Roman Catholic, she was a Dame of the Order of Malta, Dame of the Order of the Holy Sepulchre, holder of the papal Cross Pro Ecclesia et Pontifice, founder of the Carroll Club ("for Catholic business girls"), the 1933 recipient of the University of Notre Dame's Laetare Medal as the most notable lay Catholic in America, a Board Chairman of the Girl Scouts of the USA, and a Vice-President of the Welfare Council of New York. Brady was a lay adviser to the Roman Catholic Church and the second American, after Francis Augustus MacNutt, to be named Papal Chamberlain. In 1926, he was ennobled by Pope Pius XI and created a Papal Duke (ad personam, or non-hereditary). His wife was created a papal duchess in her own right.

The couple lived at 910 Fifth Avenue in New York City but also built a large Tudor Elizabethan mansion on a Manhasset estate that was completed by 1920 and known as "Inisfada" (Gaelic for "Long Island"). It was here that she entertained Eugenio Cardinal Pacelli, the then Cardinal Secretary of State who later became Pope Pius XII, on his American tour in 1936. The duchess later gave the estate to the Society of Jesus. Inisfada was used as The St. Ignatius Jesuit Retreat House before it was controversially sold and demolished in 2013.

Brady is buried in a crypt beneath an altar in the main chapel at the Jesuit Novitiate, St. Isaac Jogues, at Wernersville, Pennsylvania, an institution to which he donated more than $2 million. Genevieve Brady remarried the Irish Free State Minister to the Vatican, William J. Babington Macaulay. The papal duchess died in Rome in 1938, and her body was returned to the United States and buried beside Nicholas's. In the Church of St. Patrick in Rome a large plaque honors her life and contributions to the Catholic Church both in Rome and America. The Stations of the Cross in the church were presented to it by her second husband.
