= Francis Patrick Garvan =

American lawyer and government official

Francis P. Garvan
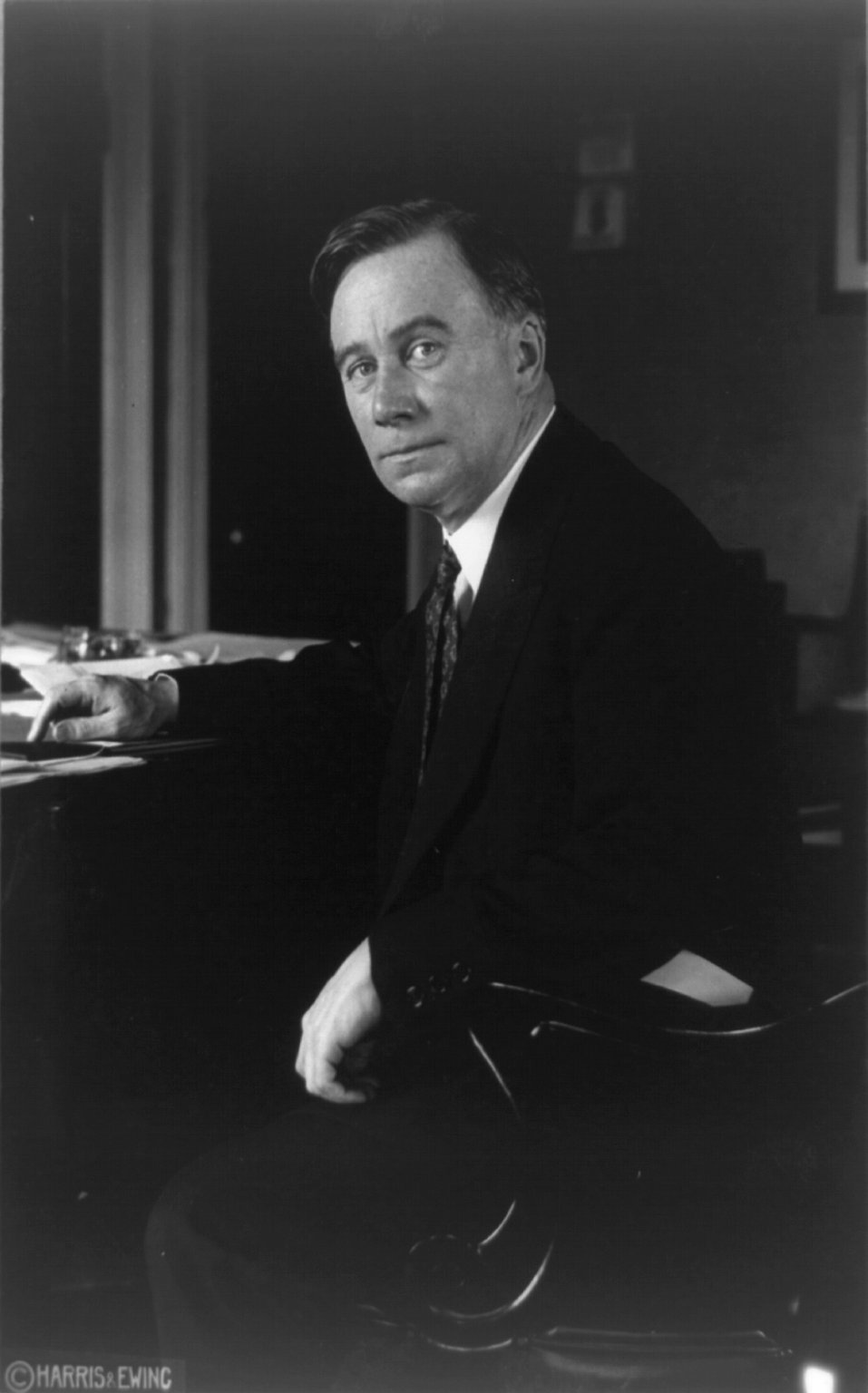
- Born: June 13, 1875; East Hartford, Connecticut
- Died: November 7, 1937 (aged 62); New York City
- Occupation: lawyer

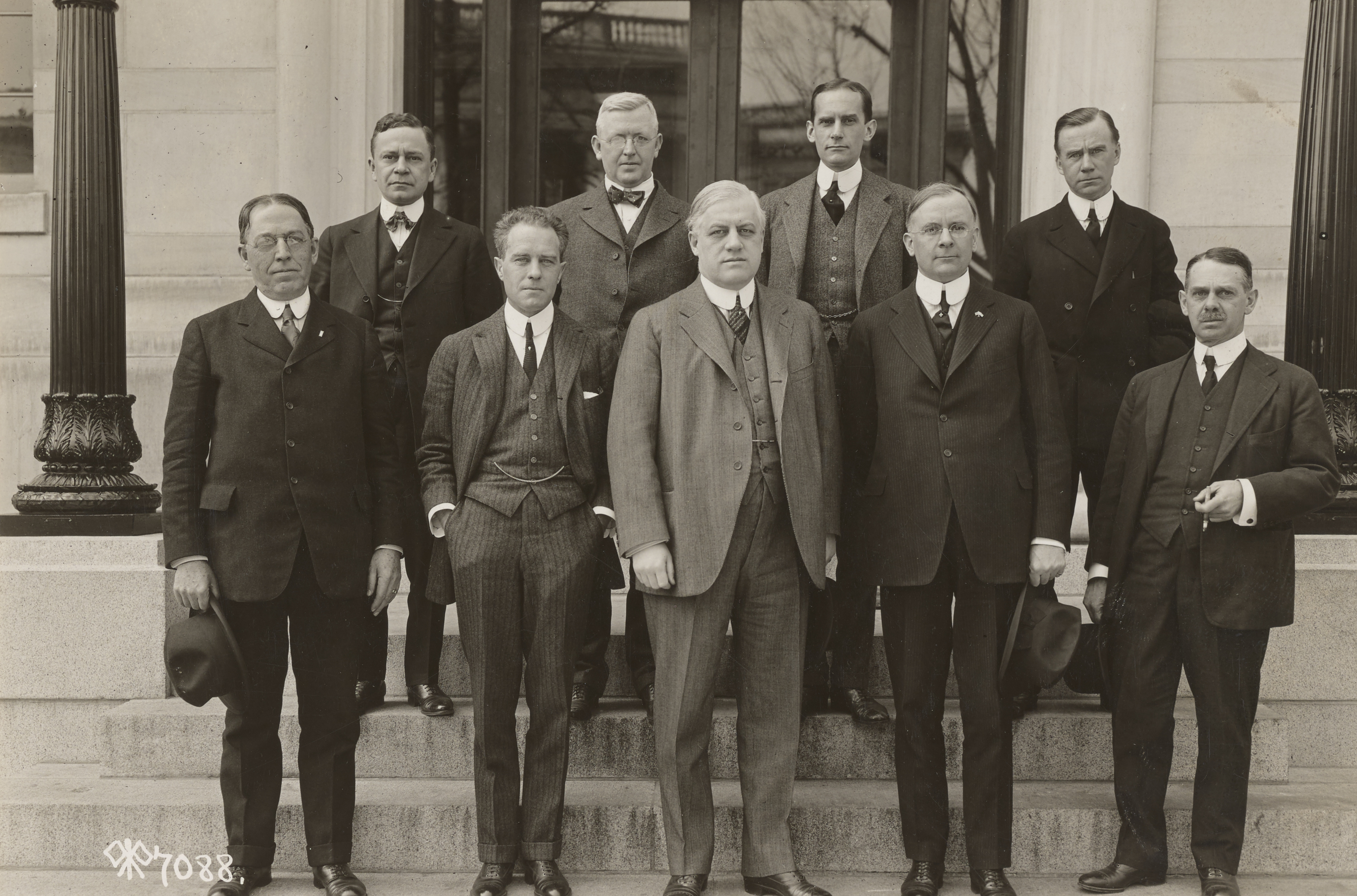
Garvan with other Alien Property Custodian officials and directors (back row, far right)

Francis Patrick Garvan (June 13, 1875 – November 7, 1937) was an American lawyer, government official, and long-time president of the Chemical Foundation, Inc. The Chemical Foundation was established to administer in the public interest 4,500 German patents associated with production of synthetic organic chemicals and related pharmaceuticals seized by the Office of Alien Property Custodian after the US entered World War I.

== Biography ==
Garvan was born June 13, 1875, in East Hartford, Connecticut. He graduated from Yale University in 1897 (A.B.) and from New York Law School in 1899 (LL.B.). He had a career as a lawyer, and then served from 1900 to 1910 as an Assistant District Attorney in New York City. Later on, he was appointed Director of Bureau of Investigations in the Office of Alien Property Custodian in the Treasury Department; an office tasked with confiscation and management of enemy property in the United States during and after World War I including, notably, patents and other assets of the German dye and chemical industries. Garvan became the second Office's Custodian in 1919 after his boss A. Mitchell Palmer stepped down.

From 1919 to 1923, Garvan also served as Dean of the Fordham University School of Law. He was a trustee of The Catholic University of America and was himself a Roman Catholic.

== Chemical Foundation ==
In 1919, President Woodrow Wilson appointed Garvan as president of the Chemical Foundation of New York, a post he held until his death. The Chemical Foundation Inc., oversaw the distribution of German patents controlled by the Office of the Alien Property. At first, the patents were acquired by the Chemical Foundation from the Office of Alien Property for $250,000 and then leased on the royalty basis to American companies. The proceeds were spent on scientific and medical research, as well as scholarships. At the time, the Chemical Foundation's income was US$ 8.6 million; however, no dividends were paid to any shareholder and the chief officers received no salaries for their work. The Chemical Foundation suffered from a number of lawsuits filed by German owners; however, the Supreme Court ruled that the process of acquisition and distribution of patents was legal.

Under Garvan's leadership, the Chemical Foundation supported the first nine years of the Journal of Chemical Education, as well as the microbiology journal Stain Technology (which came about from an idea of Garvan's). In the early 1920s, the Chemical Foundation provided over $100,000 to the Commission on the Standardization of Biological Stains, although some thought many of these funds came directly from Garvan himself. Garvan and the Chemical Foundation played a role in the founding of the American Institute of Physics, and, in collaboration with Charles Herty, the founding of the National Institutes of Health.

With financial support of the Chemical Foundation, Garvan acted as an active promoter of the Chemurgy-movement. He supported, in close collaboration with Henry Ford and others, a farm-based production of ethanol (alcohol), which finally helped to supply synthetic rubber during World War II.

Garvan and his wife, Mabel Brady Garvan, sponsored the American Chemical Society's Prize Essay Contest for seven years, in memory of their daughter. They also supported the Chemical Foundation, as it gave libraries across the United States chemistry reference works. The Garvans' donations to these causes are estimated at one million dollars.

== Honors and awards ==
In 1929, the American Chemical Society awarded Garvan its highest honor, the Priestley Medal.

In addition to the Priestley Medal (Garvan remains the only non-scientist to receive it), Garvan (jointly with his wife) was awarded in 1929 the American Institute of Chemists Gold Medal. He also received honorary degrees from Fordham, Notre Dame, and Yale Universities and Trinity College.

Garvan was also awarded the Villanova University Mendel Medal.

In his turn, Garvan established what is now known as the American Chemical Society's Francis P. Garvan - John M. Olin Medal to "recognize distinguished service to chemistry by women chemists" in 1936.

Coat of arms of Francis Patrick Garvan
Notes Confirmed 12 August 1929 by Sir Nevile Rodwell Wilkinson, Ulster King of Arms. Crest On a wreath of the colours an arm erect the hand holding a dolphin in fess Proper. Escutcheon Azure three salmon naiant Proper on a canton Or a fleur-de-lys Vert. Motto Auxilium Serviendo

== Private life ==
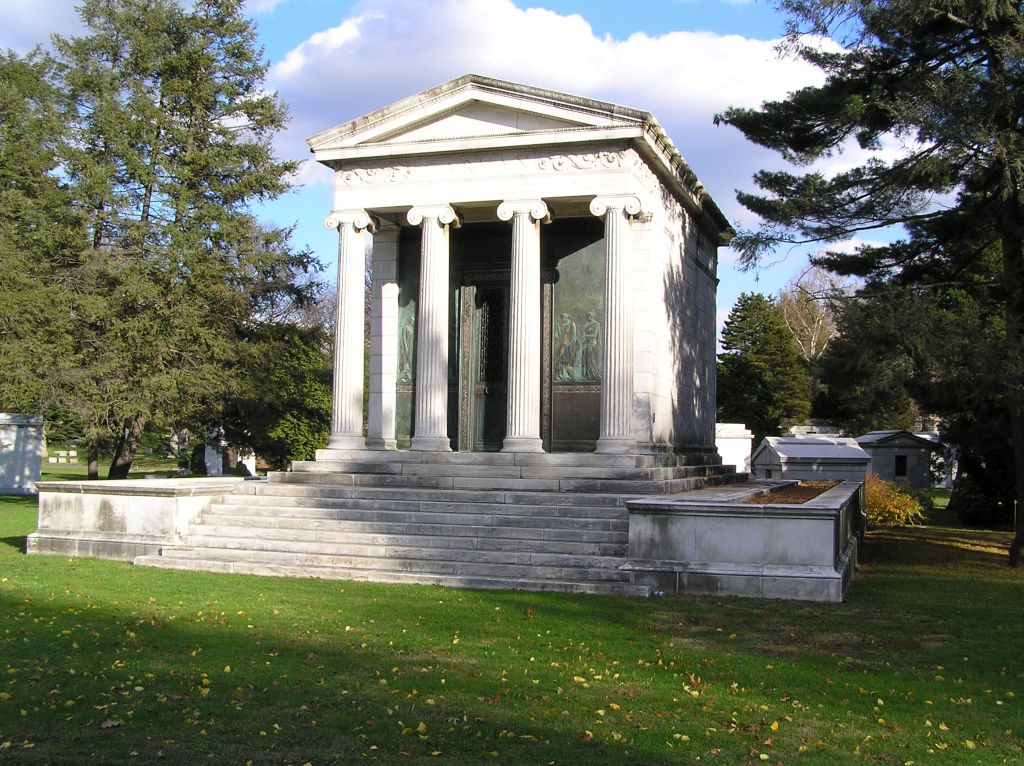
The mausoleum of Francis Patrick Garvan in Woodlawn Cemetery, Bronx, NY

Garvan was the son of Patrick Garvan, paper merchant and tobacco farmer, and Mary (Carroll) Garvan. In 1906 his sister, Genevieve Garvan, married prominent New York City businessman, Nicholas Frederic Brady. On June 9, 1910, Francis Patrick Garvan married Nicholas Brady's sister, Mabel. The couple had seven children, six of whom lived to adulthood:

1. Patricia Garvan (d. 1918)
2. Francis Patrick Garvan, Jr.
3. Mabel Brady Garvan (Mrs. Robert Philip Noble) (d. 1972)
4. Flora Brady Garvan (Mrs. Francis D. Winslow 2d)
5. Anthony Nicholas Brady Garvan
6. Peter Dunne Garvan
7. Marcia Anne Garvan (d. 2014)

Francis P. Garvan Jr., succeeded his father as the president of the Chemical Corporation in 1939.

In addition to the Garvans' chemical philanthropy, Francis Patrick Garvan and his wife Mabel Brady Garvan were collectors of decorative arts and furniture. They decided to donate the majority of assembled artifacts to Yale University. Over 10,000 art objects donated to Yale University are known today as the Mabel Brady Garvan Collection at the Yale University Art Gallery, one of the most complete collections of early American arts and crafts.

He died on November 7, 1937. Mabel Garvan continued to be involved with the Garvan-Olin Medal for thirty years after her husband's death.
