= Genevieve Garvan Brady =

Papal duchess

- Duchess of the Holy Roman Church
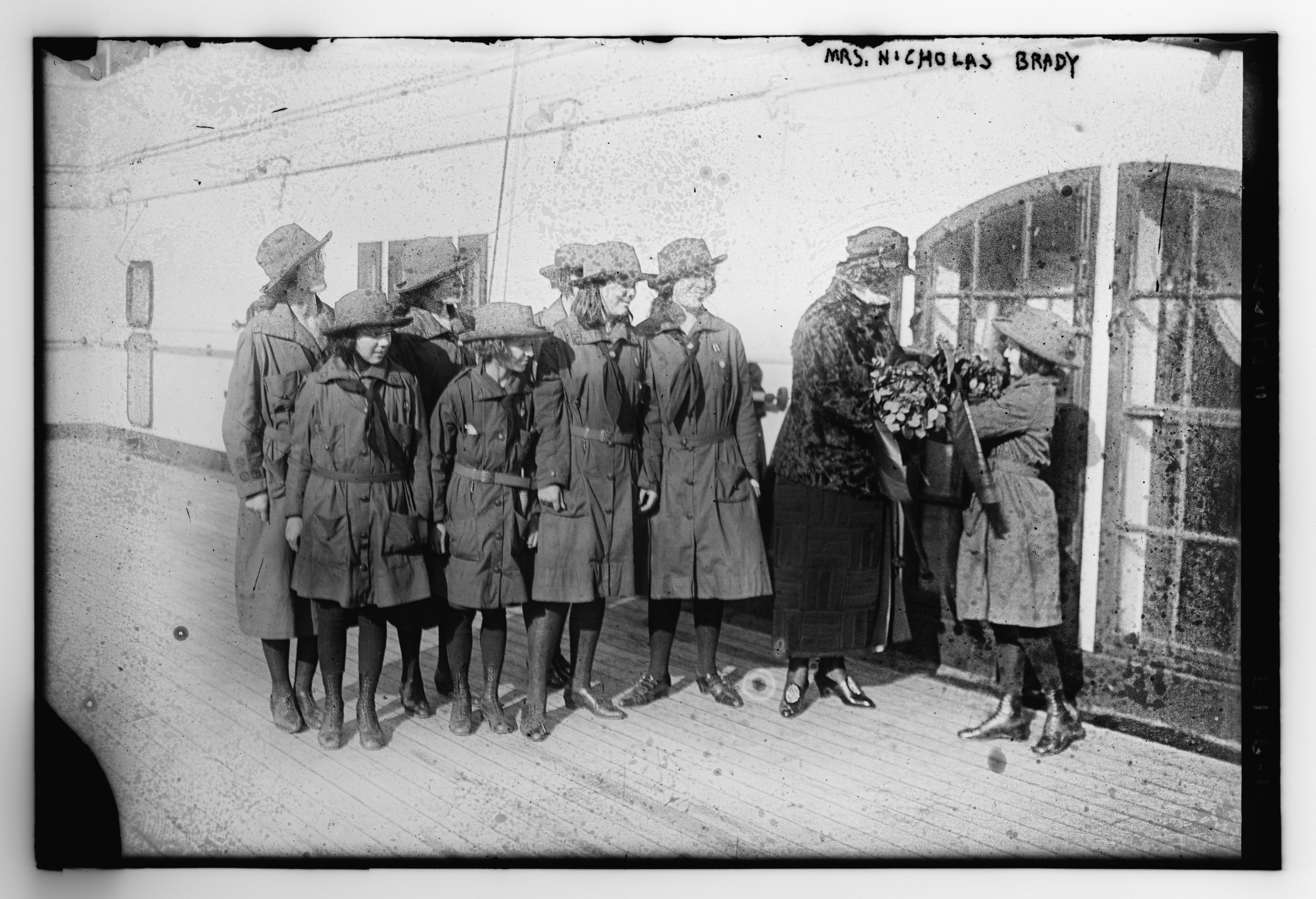
- Genevieve Garvan Brady with Girl Scouts in 1924
- Born: Genevieve Garvan; April 11, 1880; Hartford, Connecticut, United States
- Died: November 24, 1938 (aged 58); Rome, Kingdom of Italy
- Buried: Novitiate of St. Isaac Jogues; Wernersville, Pennsylvania; United States
- Spouses: Nicholas Frederic Brady, Duke of the Holy Roman Church (1906–1930; his death); William Babington Macaulay (1937–1938; her death)
- Issue: none
- Father: Patrick Garvan
- Mother: Mary Carroll

Genevieve Brady, Duchess of the Holy Roman Church (later Macaulay, née Garvan; April 11, 1880 – November 24, 1938) was an American philanthropist and patron of Catholic charities. She served as the Vice President of the Welfare Council of New York, as Vice Chair of the National Women's Committee on Welfare and Relief Mobilization, and as board chair of the Girl Scouts of the USA. In 1926, she was ennobled by Pope Pius XI, becoming a papal duchess in her own right. In 1934, she became the first woman to receive an honorary degree from Georgetown University.

== Biography ==
Genevieve Garvan was born on April 11, 1880, in Hartford, Connecticut. Her brother was Francis Patrick Garvan. A sister joined the Sisters of Mercy in Hartford, Connecticut. She was raised in the Catholic faith. She attended the Sacred Heart Convent in Providence, Rhode Island, and graduated from the College of the Sacred Heart in Westchester County, New York, before pursuing further studies in Dresden and Paris.

Garvan married Nicholas Frederic Brady on August 11, 1906. Her husband, who was raised Episcopalian, converted to Catholicism before their wedding.

During World War I, she purchased the Old Colony Club in New York City and lent it to the United States government as a mobilization center for nurses training for service in Europe. After the war she was decorated by the French government for her financial aid to refugees and was awarded the Order of the Crown by King Albert I of Belgium.

In the 1920s, Garvan and her husband spent winters at the palace of Casa del Sole in Rome to work within Vatican affairs. Her husband, who was later given the title of papal duke, was the first American to be inducted into the Supreme Order of Christ, the highest chivalric order formerly awarded by the Pope of Rome. She was made a papal duchess in 1926 by Pope Pius XI. She was also made a Dame of the Sovereign Military Order of Malta, a Dame of the Order of the Holy Sepulchre, and received the Pro Ecclesia et Pontifice.

Under First Lady Eleanor Roosevelt she served as vice chair of the National Women's Committee on Welfare and Relief Mobilization.

She was the founder of the Carroll Club, a society for Catholic businesswomen, and the board chair for the Girl Scouts of the USA. In 1936, a property she donated to the Girl Scouts was named Camp Genevieve Brady in her honor. She served as vice president of the Welfare Council of New York. In 1934, she received the University of Notre Dame's Laetare Medal as the most notable lay Catholic in America. That year, she also received an honorary Doctor of Law degree from Georgetown University president W. Coleman Nevils, the first woman awarded an honorary degree at the university.

She and her husband lived at 910 Fifth Avenue in New York City and at Inisfada, their Tudor Revival estate in Manhasset, New York. They entertained and hosted various high-ranking Catholic officials, including Francis Spellman and the future Pope Pius XII. In 1937, she donated the estate, including 250 acres of land and an 87-room mansion, to the New York Province of the Society of Jesus, which used it as a seminary before converting it into the St. Ignatius Jesuit Retreat House in 1963. Its chapel was dedicated to St. Genevieve.

Her husband died in 1930, leaving her his entire estate valued at $12 million. She, in turn, donated 95 works of art that same year to the newly established Jesuit novitiate in Wernersville, Pennsylvania, one of which was later identified as the work of Tintoretto. On March 6, 1937, Brady married William Babington Macaulay, the Irish Free State minister to the Vatican, in a private ceremony witnessed only by clergy and held without notice because Macaulay's presence was required in Rome.

She died in Rome on November 24, 1938, after a brief illness. She was buried next to her first husband in a crypt below the main altar at the Novitiate of St. Isaac Jogues in Wernersville, Pennsylvania. A plaque at the Church of St. Patrick in Rome commemorates her financial contributions to the Catholic Church. Her estate was valued at almost $6 million, much of it bequeathed to the Carroll Club and other charities.
