= Toile =

Type of fabric

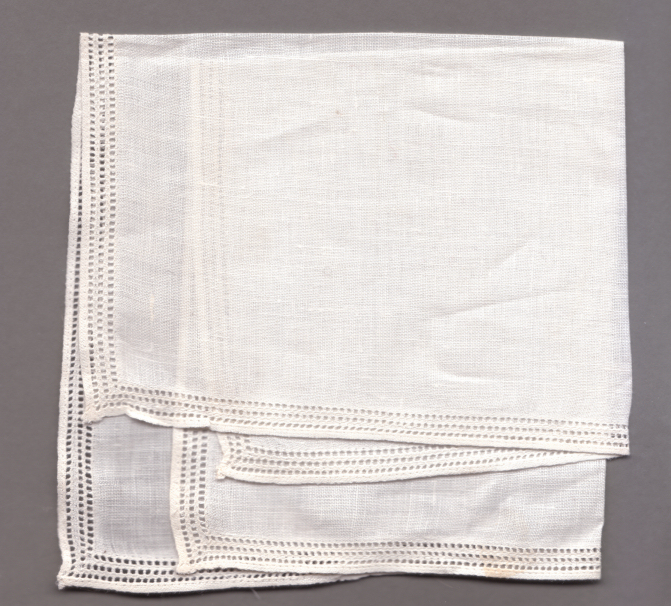
Toile

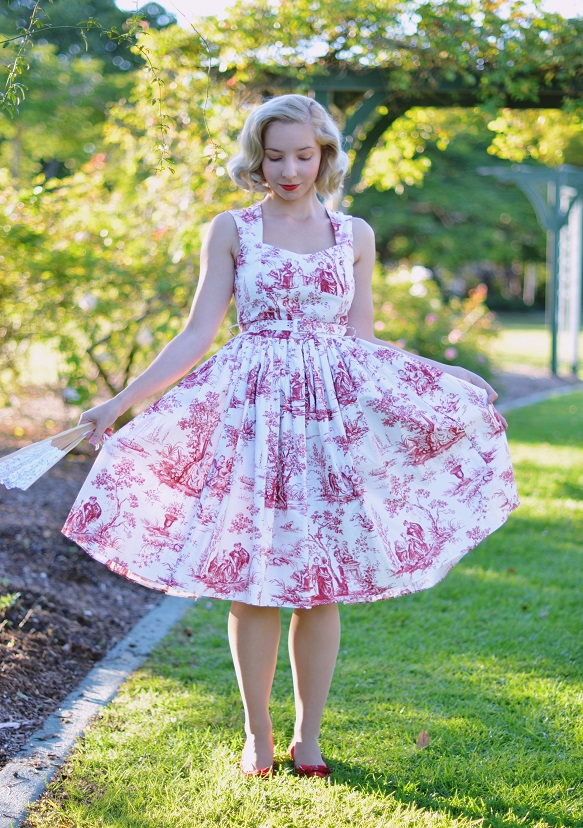
Dress from Toile de Jouy

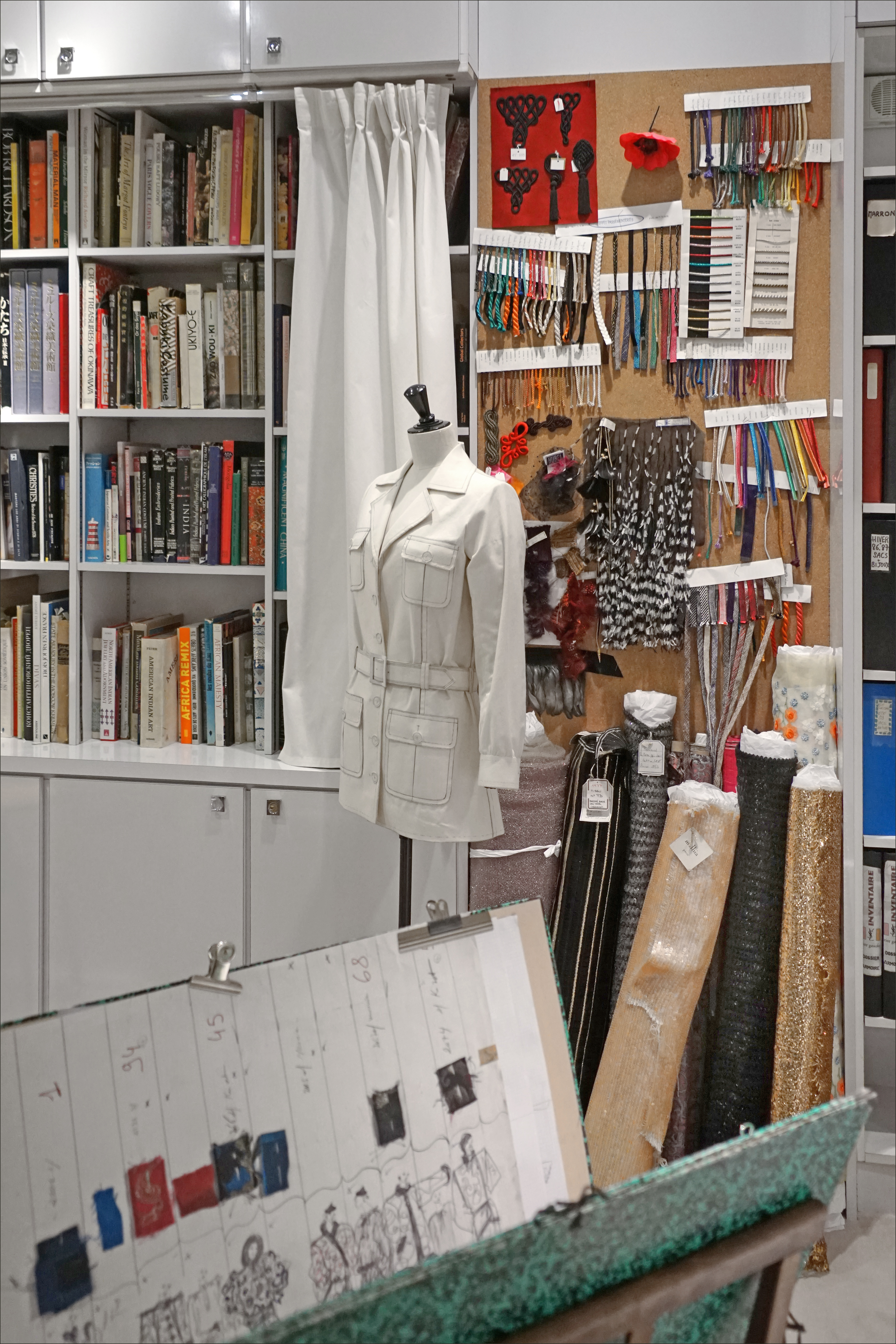
Yves Saint Laurent's studio, showing a toile for a safari jacket

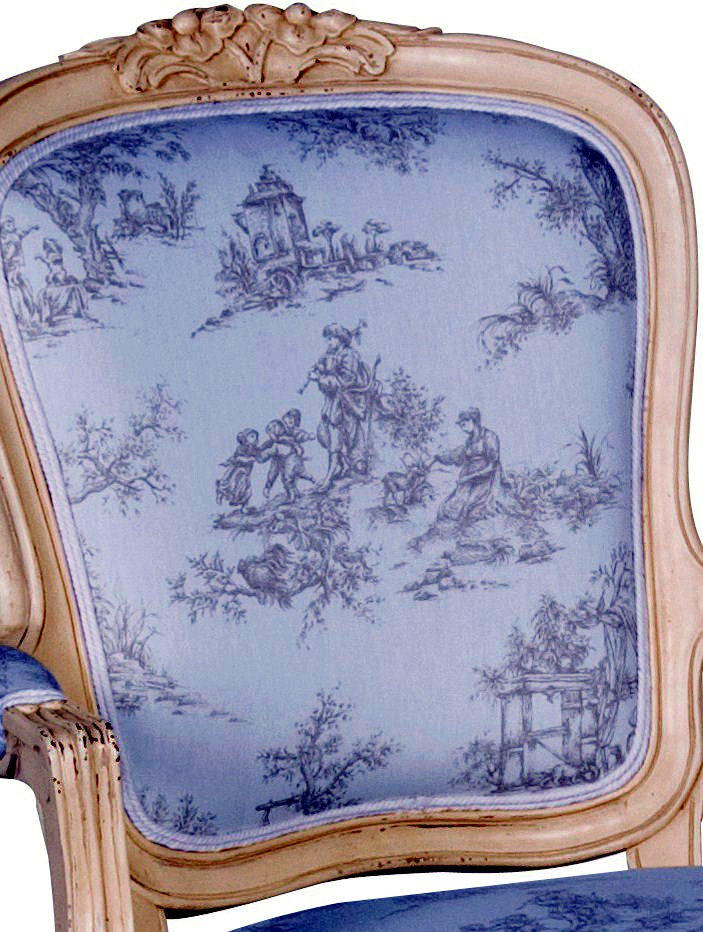
A photo of toile de jouy fabric on a French-reproduction-style chair

Toile (French for "canvas") is a textile fabric comparable to fine batiste with a cloth weave. Natural silk or chemical fiber filaments are usually used as materials. The word toile can refer to the fabric itself or to a test garment sewn from calico. The French term toile entered the English language around the 12th century, was used in the Middle Ages and has since disappeared.

== Etymology ==
Middle English toile, from French toile ("cloth"), from Old French teile, from Latin tela ("web"), from Proto-Indo-European *(s)teg ("to cover") (see List of Proto-Indo-European roots in Wiktionary). In Australian and British terminology, a toile is a version of a garment made by a fashion designer or dressmaker to test a pattern. They are usually made of calico. Multiple toiles may be made in the process of perfecting a design. In the United States toiles are sometimes referred to as muslins, because during the Middle Ages they were made from the cheap, unbleached muslin-fabric available in different weights.

=== Toile de Jouy ===
The French "Toile de Jouy" simply means "cloth from Jouy" in English and describes a type of fabric printing. "Toile de Jouy", sometimes abbreviated to simply "toile", is a type of decorating pattern consisting of a white or off-white background on which is a repeated pattern depicting a fairly complex scene, generally of a pastoral theme such as a couple having a picnic by a lake or an arrangement of flowers. The pattern portion consists of a single color, most often black, dark red, or blue. Greens, browns, and magenta toile patterns are less common, but not unheard of. Toile is most associated with fabrics (curtains and upholstery in particular, especially chintz), though toile wallpaper is also popular. Toile can also be used on teapots, beddings, clothing, etc. In upper-class (primarily American, but also northern European) society, toile is often seen on dresses or aprons used at such events as country-themed garden parties or tea parties.

Toiles were originally produced in Ireland in the mid-18th Century and quickly became popular in Britain and France. The term "Toile de Jouy" originated in France in the late 18th century. In the French language, the phrase literally means "cloth from Jouy-en-Josas", a town in the south-west suburbs of Paris.

Although it has been continuously produced since then, it experienced a marked upsurge in popularity around the year 2000. Previously only a decorating design, designers have been recently experimenting with toile-patterned apparel as well, although toile-patterned shirts were widely worn in the 1970s.

Toiles were very popular during the Colonial Era in the United States and are highly associated with preservationist towns and historical areas such as Colonial Williamsburg. When Williamsburg saw a resurgence in popularity in the 1930s, so did toiles, as they did again in the 1970s in celebration of the United States Bicentennial.

== See also ==
- Pongee
- Habutai
- Taffeta
