= Monsignor =

Honorific form of address for certain Catholic clergy

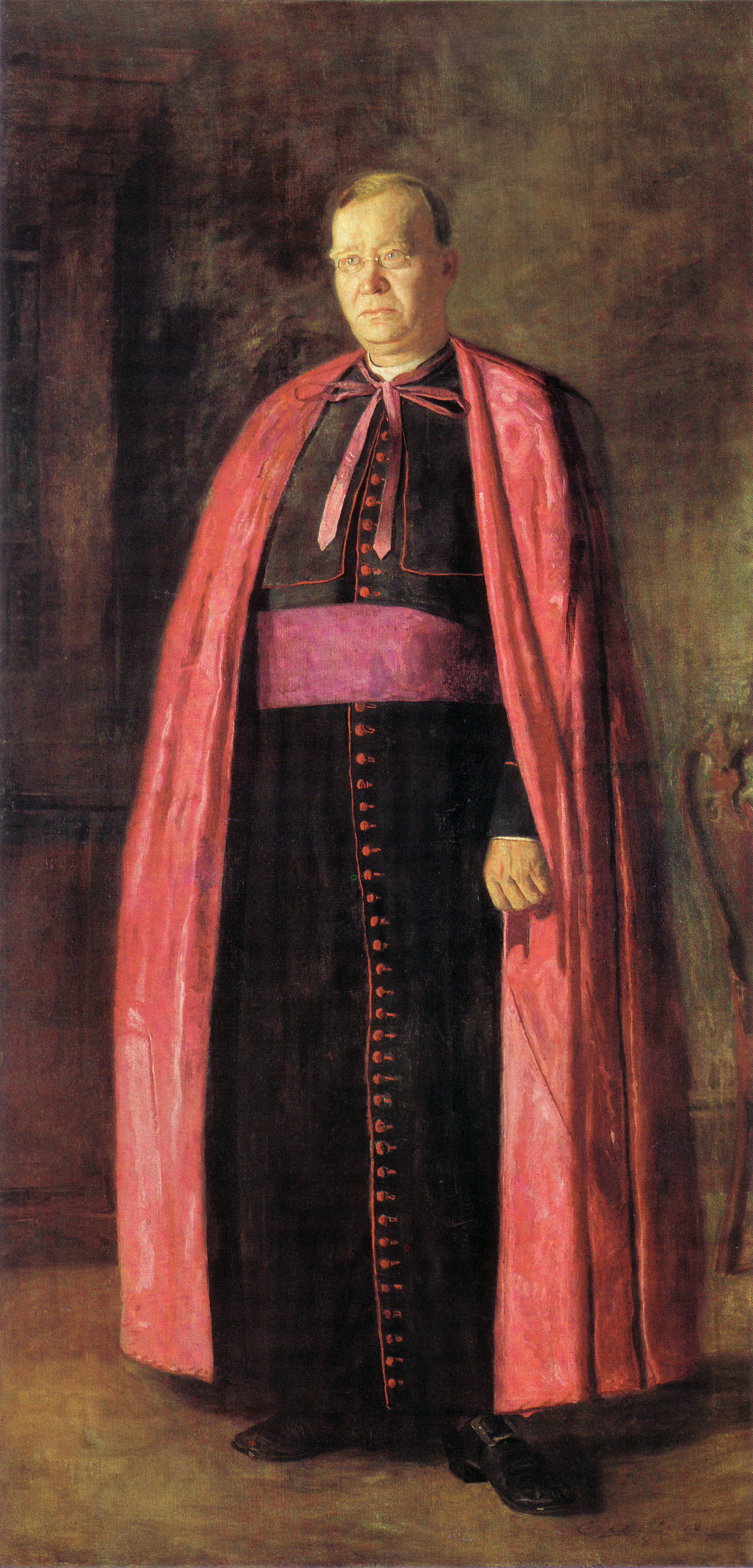
Portrait of Monsignor James F. Loughlin. The ecclesiastical dress of priests styled monsignor is similar to that of bishops.

Monsignor (/mɒnˈsiːnjər/ mon-SEEN-yər; Italian: monsignore [monsiɲˈɲoːre]) is a form of address or honorific for certain members of the clergy in the Catholic Church.

It is the apocopic form of the Italian monsignore, a loan from French monseigneur meaning "my lord". "Monsignor" can be abbreviated as Mons. or Msgr. (Note: Especially in the United States e.g. Roman Catholic Diocese of Dallas, Diocese of Miami, Diocese of Tyler.) (Note: E.g. Diocese of Derry, Parish of Zejtun, Malta. This is the regular abbreviation in Italian.) In some languages like Italian, the title "monsignore" is used as a form of address for all bishops, but, officially, the title is unrelated to the episcopacy (though many priests with the title of "monsignor" later become bishops).

The title "monsignor" is a form of address, not an appointment such as a bishop or cardinal, meaning that a priest cannot be "made a monsignor" or become "the monsignor of a parish". Instead, the title "Monsignor" is normally used by clergy who have received one of the three classes of papal honors:

- Protonotary apostolic (the highest class)
- Honorary prelate
- Chaplain of His Holiness (the lowest class)

The pope bestows these honors upon clergy who:

- Have rendered a valuable service to the Church
- Provide some special function in Church governance
- Are members of bodies such as certain chapters

Clerics working in the Roman Curia and the Vatican diplomatic service are eligible for all three honors, while priests working in a diocese are only eligible for the honor "Chaplain of His Holiness". Priests must be nominated by their bishop; an additional requirement in the reign of Pope Francis was the minimum age of 65 years. Pope Leo XIV reverted to the traditional practice by bestowing the title on Indian priest Sebastian Febin Puthiyaparambil of the Syro-Malabar Catholic Eparchy of Thamaraserry.

== Current honor rules ==
=== Current honor classes ===
Pope Paul VI, in his 1968 publication motu proprio Pontificalis Domus, reduced the number of papal honors allowing "Monsignor" as a style from 14 to three. The protonotary apostolic class was divided into two subsections. The classes of chamberlains and chaplains were abolished, leaving only a single class of "chaplains of his holiness". The three papal honor classes are:

- Protonotary apostolic (two subclasses):
  - De numero (the higher and less common form)
  - Supernumerary (the highest grade of monsignor found outside the Vatican)
- Prelate of Honour of His Holiness (formerly the "domestic prelate")
- Chaplain of His Holiness (formerly the "supernumerary privy chamberlain")

=== Current honor eligibility ===
In March 2013, Pope Francis suspended the granting of papal honors, with the title of monsignor, to all clergy except members of the Vatican diplomatic service. However, by 2022 the title had started to be awarded again.

At the October 2013 meeting of the Council of Cardinal Advisers, Pope Francis stated his desire to scale back the honors as part of a broader effort to project a more modest and pastoral vision of leadership. As Archbishop of Buenos Aires, Pope Francis never requested papal honors for his priests, associating the honors with clerical "careerism".

In December 2013, Pope Francis decreed that diocesan priests could become "Chaplain of His Holiness", the lowest of the three papal honors. He also set a minimum age required of 65. Existing honors were not affected. Pope Francis decided to continue papal honors from all three classes for two groups of clergy:

- Officials of the Roman Curia
- Members of the diplomatic service.

=== Current forms of address ===
These are the current forms of address for a monsignor:

- The written form is Monsignor (first name) (last name) or The Reverend Monsignor (first name) (last name). For example, "Monsignor Bob Smith" or "The Reverend Monsignor Bob Smith".
- The spoken form is Monsignor (last name). For example, "Monsignor Smith".

In English-speaking countries, bishops and archbishops are not called "monsignor". However, in 1969 the Vatican Secretariat of State indicated that bishops may be addressed as "monsignor". In some countries, the titles "Monsignore", "Monseigneur", "Monsenyor", and "Monseñor" are used for bishops, archbishops and any other prelates below the rank of cardinal or patriarch.

The 1969 instruction also indicated that for bishops "Reverendissimus" (translated as "most reverend") could be added to the word "monsignor". For example, the "Most Reverend Monsignor John Doe". This instruction also applied to:

- Prelates without episcopal rank who head offices of the Roman Curia
- Judges of the Rota
- The promotor general of justice and the defender of the bond of the Apostolic Signatura
- Protonotaries apostolic "de numero"
- The four clerics of the camera.

=== Current ecclesiastical dress ===
In 1979, the Vatican simplified the dress of monsignors:

==== Chaplains of His Holiness ====
Purple-trimmed black cassocks with purple sashes, good for all occasions.

==== Honorary prelates ====
Red-trimmed black cassocks with purple sashes, good for all occasions. Purple cassocks as choir dress for liturgical events of special solemnity.

==== Supernumerary protonotaries apostolics ====
Red-trimmed black cassocks with purple sashes. Purple cassocks as choir dress. Can also wear the purple ferraiuolo, a silk cape. The ferraiuolo is for non-liturgical events, such as graduation and commencement ceremonies.

==== Protonotaries apostolics de numero ====
Red-trimmed black cassocks with purple sashes and the purple ferraiuolo. Purple cassocks as choir dress. They can wear the mantelletta in choir dress with a black biretta with a red tuft.

== Previous honor rules ==
=== Previous honor classes ===
The Catholic church originally maintained 14 classes of papal honors. A priest with the title of "privy chamberlain" would lose the title when the pope who granted it died. When the pope abolished the privy chamberlain class in 1968, the rule was abolished also. These 14 previous classes included:

- Domestic prelates
- Four kinds of protonotaries apostolic,
- Four kinds of papal chamberlains, and at least
- Five types of papal chaplains.

The 14 honor categories were reduced to three categories in 1969.

=== Previous age requirements ===
Under Pope Paul VI, the Secretariat of State set minimum qualifications of age and priesthood for the three papal honor classes:

- Chaplains of his holiness – minimum age 35 and 10 years as priest
- Honorary prelates – minimum age 45 and 15 years as priest
- Protonotaries apostolic supernumerary – minimum age 55 and 20 years as priest

The Secretariat waived the minimum-age limit for vicars general proposed for appointment as honorary prelates. The reasoning was that as long as a priest holds the office of vicar general, he is also protonotary apostolic supernumerary. A vicar general could not be named chaplain of his holiness. All these criteria were superseded in 2013.

=== Previous forms of address ===
- Priests with the title Chaplain of His Holiness were formerly addressed in English as "The Very Reverend Monsignor".
- Priests with the titles Protonotary Apostolic or Honorary Prelate were addressed as "The Right Reverend Monsignor".

These forms were changed in 1969.

Generic coat of arms of a protonotary apostolic: amaranth galero with 12 scarlet tassels

Generic coat of arms of an honorary prelate: amaranth galero with 12 violet tassels

Generic coat of arms of a chaplain of his holiness: black galero with 12 violet tassels

== Other monsignors ==
Under the legislation of Pope Pius X, vicars general and vicars capitular (now called diocesan administrators) were titular (not actual) protonotaries durante munere. As long as these priests held the office, they were allowed to bear the title of monsignor. Vicars general and diocesan administrators were allowed to wear:

- A black, silk-fringed sash (fascia)
- Black piping on the biretta with a black tuft
- A black mantelletta.

As a result of this they were in some countries referred to as "black protonotaries". However, the 1968 motu proprio Pontificalis Domus of Pope Paul VI removed the position of titular protonotary from the Papal Household, even though the title of monsignor, which is to be distinguished from a prelatial rank, has not been withdrawn from vicars general – as can be seen, for instance, from the placing of the abbreviated title Mons. before the name of every member of the secular (diocesan) clergy listed as a vicar general in the Annuario Pontificio.

== See also ==
- Archpriest
- Catholic Church hierarchy
- Milord
- Monsieur

== Bibliography ==
- Baumgarten, Paul Maria (1913). "Monsignor" . In Herbermann, Charles (ed.). Catholic Encyclopedia. New York: Robert Appleton Company.
- Boudinhon, A. (1913). "Monseigneur" . In Herbermann, Charles (ed.). Catholic Encyclopedia. New York: Robert Appleton Company.
- Galles, Duane LCM (March 19, 1999), Chaplains of His Holiness, St. Joseph Foundation
- Heim, Bruno Bernard (1978). Heraldry in the Catholic Church. Humanities Press. ISBN 0-391-00873-0.
- Kirsch, J.P. (1913). "Prothonotary Apostolic" . In Herbermann, Charles (ed.). Catholic Encyclopedia. New York: Robert Appleton Company.
- Secretary of State, Cardinal (2000) [28 March 1969], Miranda, Salvador (ed.), "Instruction on the dress, titles and coat-of-arms of cardinals, bishops and lesser prelates", L'Osservatore Romano, vol. II, The Vatican, p. 4 Latin text of the Instruction, with an unofficial English translation.
- Noonan, James-Charles jr (1996), The Church Visible: The Ceremonial Life and Protocol of the Roman Catholic Church, Viking, pp. 315–16, ISBN 0-670-86745-4
- Montini, Giovanni Battista Enrico Antonio Maria (28 March 1968), Pontificalis domus [On the Papal Household, Reform of the Use of Pontifical Insignia, Simplification of Pontifical Rites and Insignia] (in Latin), Washington, D.C.: United States Catholic Conference, Italian
- ——— (21 June 1968), Pontificalis insignia [Pontifical insignia] (in Latin), Rome, IT: The Vatican, Italian
