= Tissue (cloth) =

Thin, transparent, and lightweight textile

Tissue is a thin, transparent, and lightweight fabric. Tissue fabric is a suitable material for designing various types of garments, including saris. Tissue is characterized by the use of metallic yarns for decorative purposes. The tissue sari is composed of silk threads in the warp and zari in the weft.

== Etymology ==
The word tissue has its origins in the French language, specifically from the term tissu, which means fabric.

== Characteristics and types ==
The term tissue is used to denote a type of fabrics that are characterized by their delicate, lightweight, and transparent nature. Tissue gingham is a type of plain-weave fabric that is lightweight and is characterized by its yarn-dyed construction. Tissue fabric may be woven, knitted, or even nonwoven, and features a film-like layer.

Tissue faille is a type of lightweight dress material, which is produced using an acetate warp and rayon in the weft. At one point, it was also recognized as a trademark material and commonly used for blouses.

The tissue figured cloths belong to the class of intricately patterned muslins that are produced using the jacquard weaving technique. These textiles are created using fine threads for the base material, while the designs are formed through the use of thicker filling yarns. Tissue taffeta can be described as a taffeta textile that is both delicate and lightweight, featuring a sheer quality. The fabric known as silver or gold tissue can be characterized as a type of metal cloth, woven from fine threads of silver or gold, and possessing a transparent and gauzy texture. Tissue matelassé was a type of Tissue fabric introduced in 1839, characterized by a surface of small squares resembling quilting. This fabric was commonly used for making overcoats for men.

== Use ==
The mention of court dresses, gowns made from tissue fabric is noted in records from the early 1700s. Tissue has been used as dress material for various types of clothing, such as saris, turbans, veils, and others. Negligee are made from wool and silk blends.

Tissue fabric has been utilized in women's clothing for a considerable period of time. Historical records reveal several instances of dresses made from tissue fabric, which have been utilized in various ways. Here are a few examples:

- In 1851, Queen Victoria wore a pink dress made from shot silk and silver tissue to the opening of the Great Exhibition.
- Princess Charlotte of England wore a trained wedding dress in 1816, which was made of machine-made warp net of silk and embellished with silver thread and strip embroidery. The net borders were adorned with floral, leaf, and shell motifs, while the underskirt was crafted from silver tissue.
- Tissue satins, alongside other lightweight fabrics such as satin-backed crepes and crepes de Chine, held the predominant position in the realm of women's high fashion during the 1920s.

=== Tissue sari ===
A tissue saree (or tar-bana) is typically composed of a pure silk body on the warp, while the weft and borders are made of gold thread. Additionally, the weft is made of gold lace and the silk warp is doubled in both the heddles and reed, resulting in a heavier fabric than usual. Brocades on Tissue sarees are woven using silk yarn for the body and feature exquisite zari patterns on the pallu, which is the border of the sari.

Kanchipuram is a well-known hub for crafting Tissue sarees, which are made by skillfully interweaving silk and lace. These sarees are available in different sizes, ranging from 0.61 to 1.32 meters in width and 5.49 to 9.14 meters in length. They are adorned with various colors and designs, and boast attractive borders.

Banaras has been renowned for its weaving heritage since ancient times. The city is particularly celebrated for producing various types of sarees in its weaving centers. Among these, several exclusive varieties hold a special place, including jangla, tanchoi, vaskat, cutwork, tissue, and butidar.

Indian fashion designers continue to incorporate Tissue fabric as a decorative element in their dress collections. Designed by Sabyasachi, Alia Bhatt wore an embroidered handwoven tissue veil during her wedding ceremony. Manish Malhotra designed a sari which was adorned with large tissue ruffles, worn by Mira Rajput Kapoor.
