= Fascia (sash) =

Sash worn in the Catholic and Anglican Church

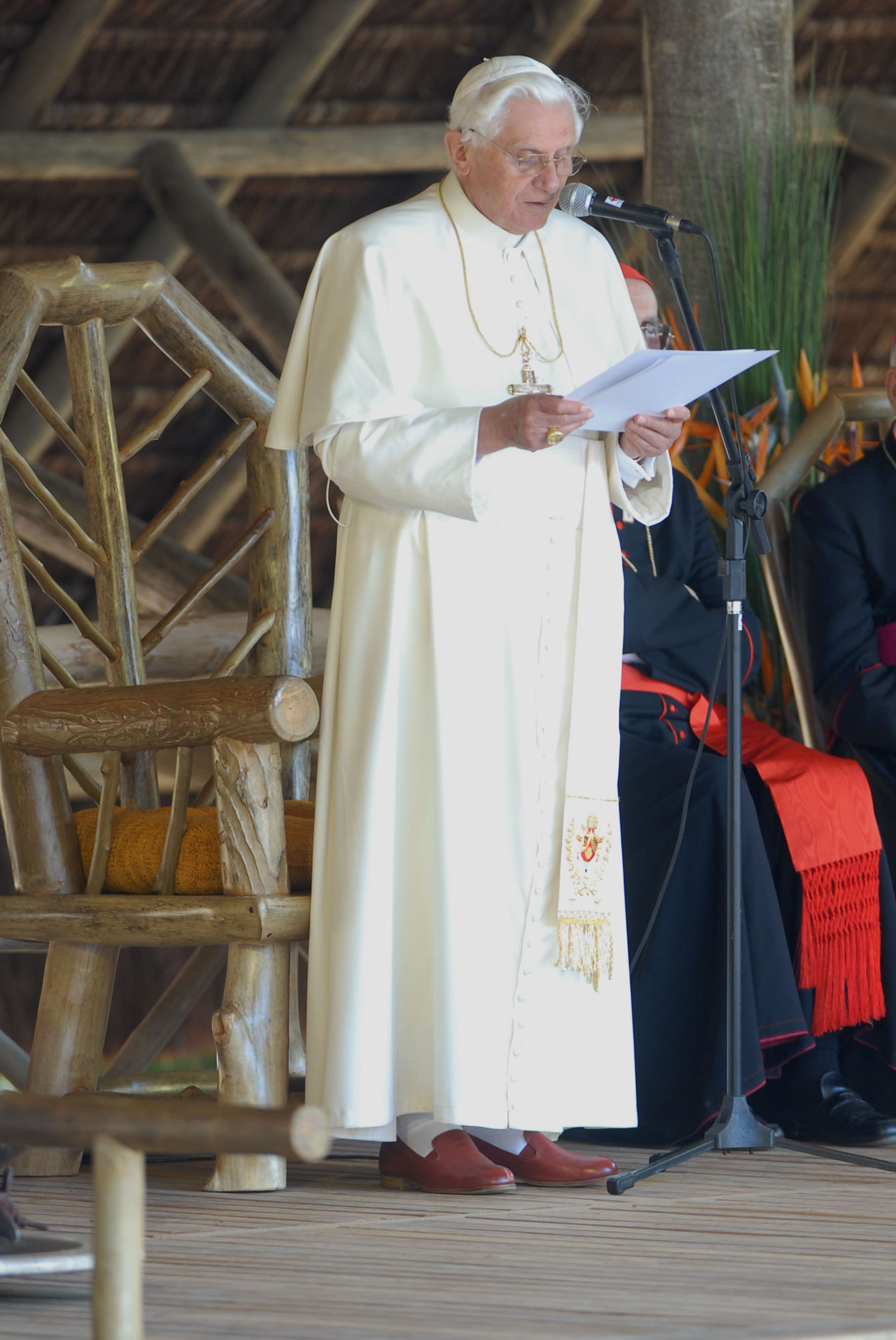
Pope Benedict XVI in white cassock with fringed fascia. Note his coat of arms embroidered near the bottom. The cardinal sitting behind him is wearing a plain scarlet red fascia.

The fascia is a sash worn by clerics and seminarians with the cassock in the Catholic Church, in the Anglican Church, and, in certain cases, in Methodism. It is not worn as a belt but is placed above the waist between the navel and the breastbone (sternum). The ends that hang down are worn on the left side of the body and placed a little forward but not completely off the left hip.

== Etymology ==
Fasciare is the Latin word for to bind or wrap. This meaning of binding together shows a significance of the fascia keeping the cassock tight to the cleric.

== Use ==
The fascia is not a vestment, but is part of choir dress and is also used in more solemn everyday dress.

== Colours ==
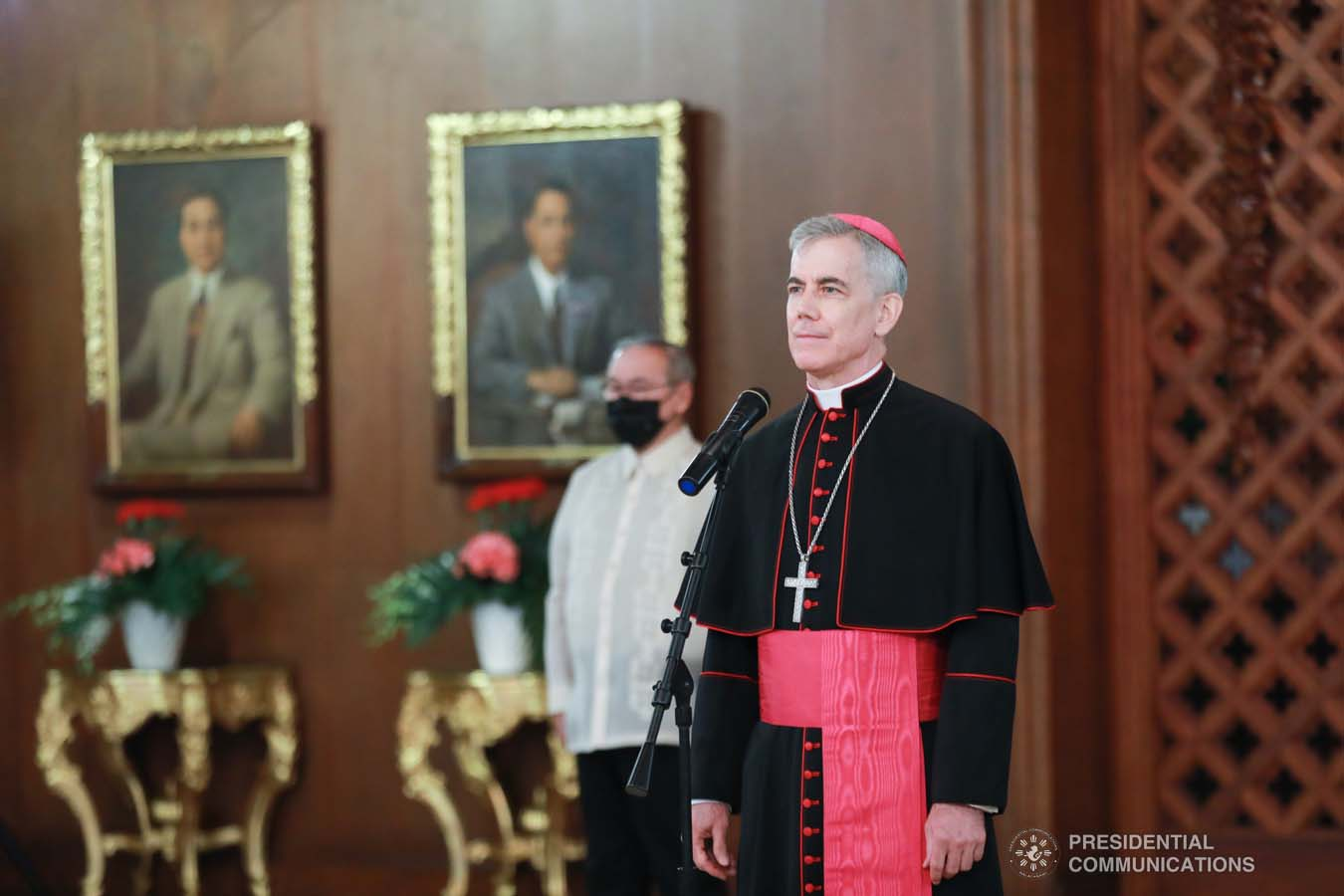
Watered silk fascia of nuncio, Archbishop Charles Brown

The Pope's fascia is white. Only the Pope may have his coat of arms placed on the ends of the fascia that hang down near or past the knees. The fascia worn by cardinals is scarlet-red watered silk. Fascia of purple watered silk are worn by nuncios within the territories assigned to them. Plain (not watered) purple fascia are worn by patriarchs, archbishops and bishops who are not cardinals, and also by protonotaries apostolic, honorary prelates, and chaplains of the Pope, these three being the different ranks of monsignors, from highest to lowest. However, the Eastern Catholic patriarchs have been allowed to wear scarlet fascia in their choir dress at times, especially before Vatican II, even when they were not also cardinals. Black fascia are worn by priests, deacons, seminarians, and acolytes and the fascia worn by priests in the service of the Papal Household is black watered silk.

== Forms ==
Prior to the changes that followed the Second Vatican Council there were two types of fascia: the tufted fascia, on which each end was finished in a single large tassel, and the fringed fascia, on which each end is straight and finished with fringe. The Instruction Ut sive sollicite of the Secretariat of State, dated 31 March 1969, declared that "the sash with tassels is abolished" for cardinals, bishops, and "Prelate Superiors of the Dicasteries of the Roman Curia who do not have the episcopal dignity, the Auditors of the Sacred Roman Rota, the Promotor General of Justice and the Defender of the Bond in the Supreme Tribunal of the Apostolic Signatura, the Protonotaries Apostolic de numero, the Clerics of the Apostolic Camera and the Prelates of the Pontifical Antechamber". This Instruction did not deal with canons, some few of whom have retained the tufted sash to which membership of their particular chapter entitled them.
