= Petersham =

Petersham may refer to:

== Places ==
=== Australia ===
- Petersham, New South Wales, Australia
  - Petersham railway station, a station serving Petersham, Australia
  - Petersham RUFC, a Rugby Club in Sydney, Australia
  - Petersham Girls High School, a school in Petersham, New South Wales, Australia
- Electoral district of Petersham, an electoral district in New South Wales, Australia
- Petersham Parish, Cumberland, a parish in New South Wales, Australia
- Municipality of Petersham, a former government district in New South Wales
- Randwick Petersham Cricket Club, a cricket club in Sydney, Australia
- All Saints Anglican Church, Petersham, a church in Petersham, New South Wales, Australia

=== United Kingdom ===
- Petersham, London, United Kingdom
  - Petersham Parish Church, a church in Petersham, United Kingdom
  - Petersham Common, London, a park near Petersham, United Kingdom
  - Petersham Hole, a disaster in Petersham, United Kingdom
  - Petersham Ait, another name for Glovers Island, an island on the River Thames
  - Ham and Petersham Cricket Club, a cricket club in London, United Kingdom
  - Sudbrook Park, Petersham, a house in Petersham, United Kingdom
- HMS Petersham (M2718), a former ship of the Royal Navy
- Petersham Lodge, a gate of Richmond Park, London, United Kingdom

=== United States ===
- Petersham, Massachusetts, a New England town
  - Petersham (CDP), Massachusetts, the central village in the town
  - Petersham Common Historic District, a historic district in the town
- Petersham State Forest Park, a state forest park in Massachusetts

== Clothing ==
- Petersham ribbon, a flexible corded ribbon use by milliners and tailors

== People ==
- Maud and Miska Petersham, a pair of authors
- Viscount Petersham, a title given to the Earl of Harrington
  - Charles Stanhope, 12th Earl of Harrington
  - Charles Stanhope, 4th Earl of Harrington
