= Sharkskin =

Woven fabric type

Sharkskin, or grisaille (from French gris, meaning grey) describes a specific woven or warp-knitted fabric with a distinctive sheen. Sharkskin is a twill weave fabric created using acetate, rayon, worsted wool, and synthetic fibers.

The arrangement of darker and brighter threads in a twill weave creates a subtle pattern of lines that run across the fabric diagonally and a two tone, lustrous appearance. Primarily a suiting material, the fabric is sometimes seen in light jackets and non-fashion items such as curtains, tablecloths, and as a liner in diving suits and wetsuits.

== Composition ==
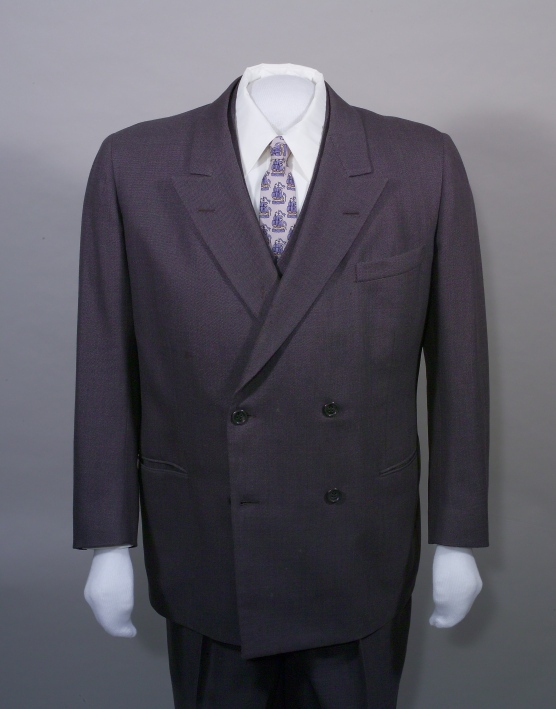
President Harry S. Truman's sharkskin suit, 1950s

Sharkskin has historically been made with different types of natural fibers, including mohair, wool and silk.

More expensive variations exist and are often demarcated by fabric content labels bearing "Golden Fleece" or "Royal" titles. These indicate an older style of sharkskin fabric that was extremely rare and were costly to produce. These fabrics produced in small quantities, were manufactured in South America by transplanted German and Italian weavers during the 1950s and 1960s. The South American produced sharkskin included local materials such as vicuña, guanaco, or alpaca in such blends.

Natural sharkskin fabric was made primarily using silk fibers woven to create a signature two-tone pattern.

== Artificial variations ==
Artificial sharkskin variants used for suiting first appeared in the 1950s. These variants made more significant use of wool and synthetic fibers in their construction. The addition of synthetics can create a heightened metallic-like sheen, and/or added flexibility. Artificial sharkskin, in part for its comparably low price point, gained traction as a clothing material in the early 1960s and the disco era of the late 1970s. Its popularity waned, but enjoyed brief fashion resurgences in the mid-1980s, mid-1990s and late 2000s.

== Middle East ==
British diplomat Sir Terence Clark in the 1950s served in Bahrain. He reminisced that the requisite winter evening wear for a diplomat was a white sharkskin dinner jacket. Lucette Lagnado in her prize-winning memoir about her childhood, The Man in the White Sharkskin Suit: My Family's Exodus from Old Cairo to the New World uses the imagery of the white sharkskin suit to evoke the glamorous evening life in Egypt in the 1950s. Early in Justine, Lawrence Durrell mentions the heroine sitting in front of a multi-panel mirror trying out a sharkskin dress; the book is set in the high society of diplomats and businessmen in Alexandria in the 1930s, a city where Durrell spent much time during World War II, a few years later.

== See also ==
- Shot silk
