= Chiffon (fabric) =

Sheer, lightweight plain-woven textile

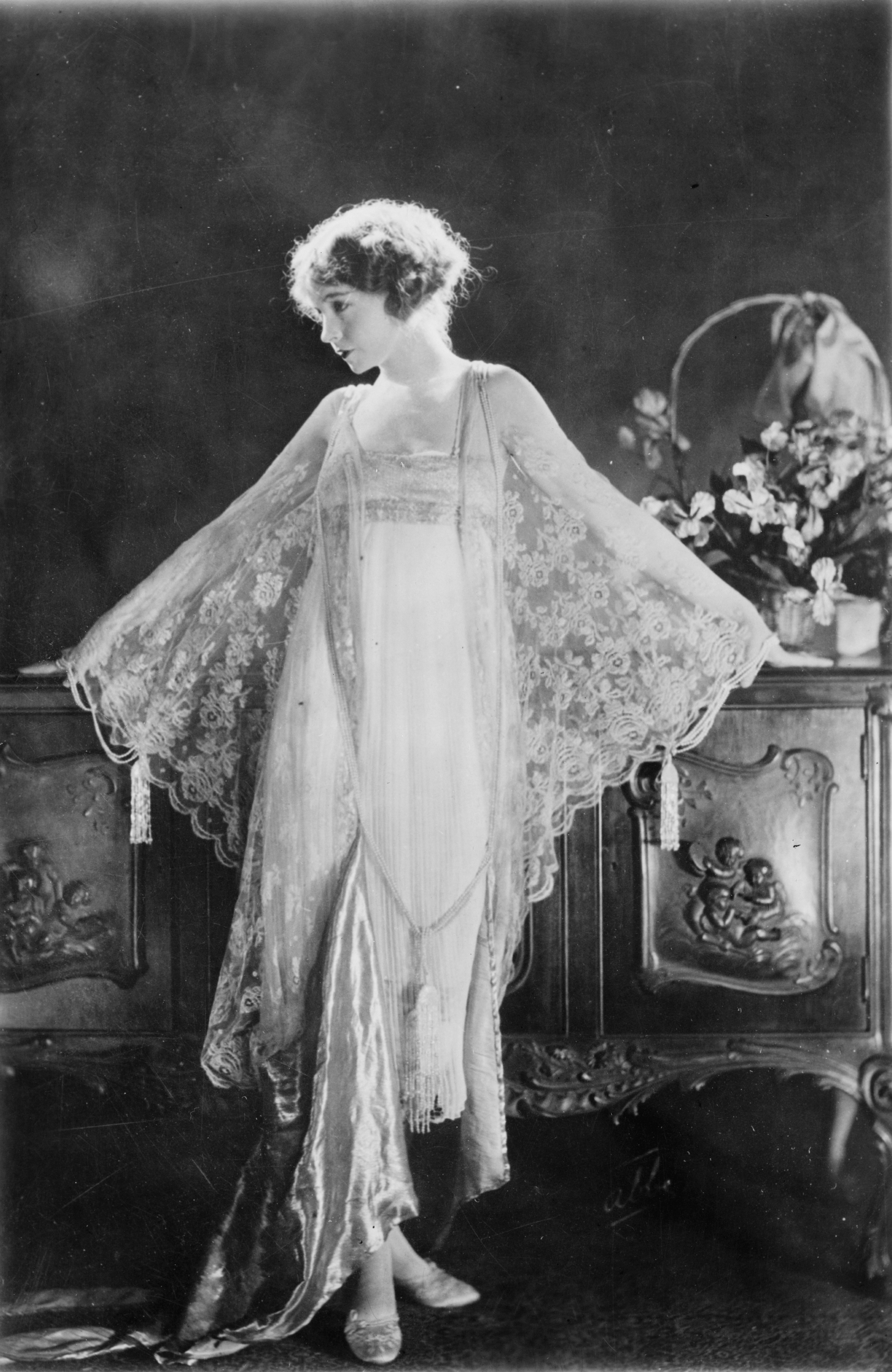
The American actress Lillian Gish in morning dress in chiffon and lace in 1922

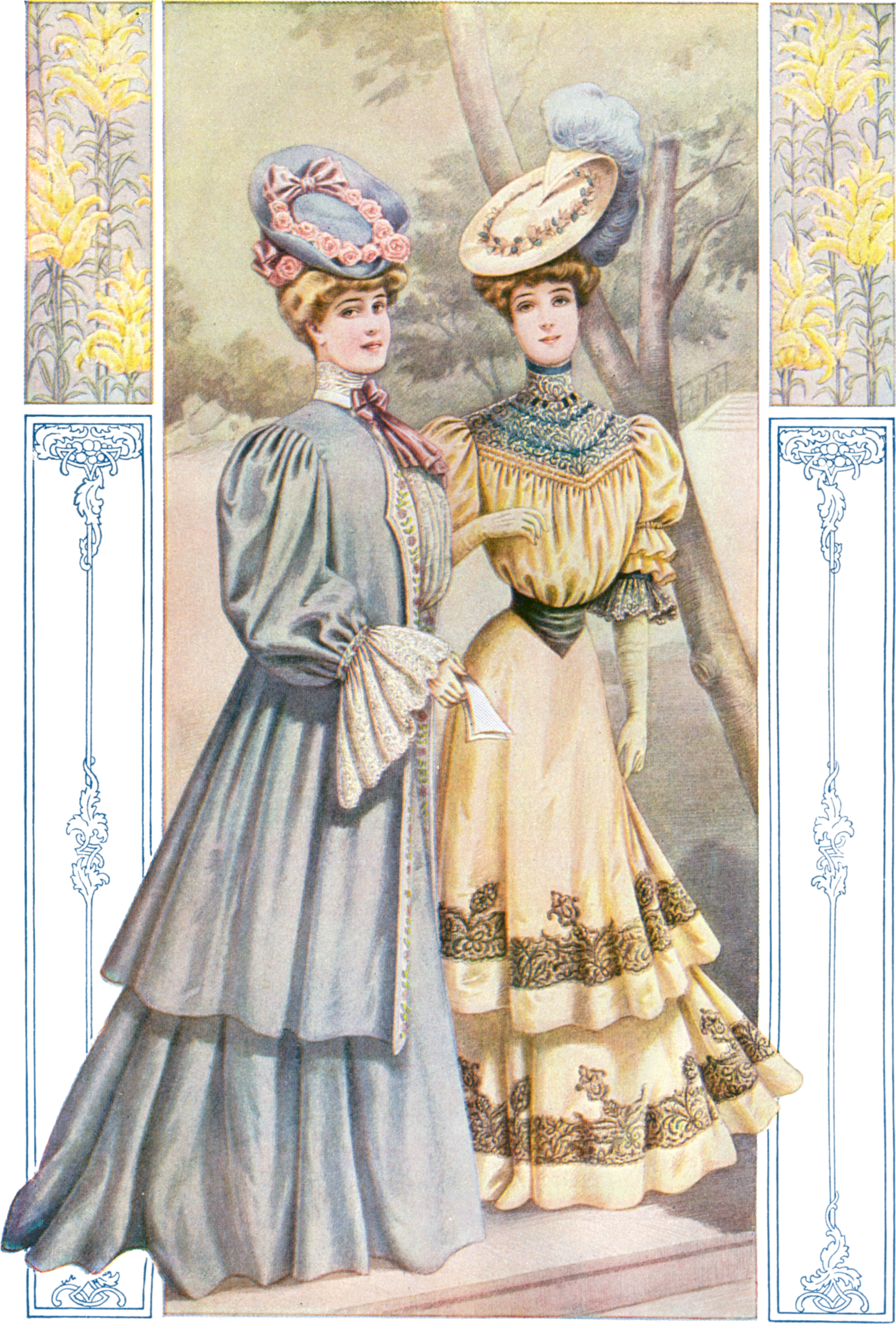
Coat and skirt street suit of gray chiffon broadcloth with embroidery and lace decoration (1905)

Chiffon (French: [ʃi.fɔ̃]; English: /ʃɪˈfɒn/, shif-ON), from the French word chiffe which means "cloth or rag"; is a lightweight, balanced plain-woven sheer fabric, or gauze, like gossamer, woven of alternate S- and Z-twist crepe (high-twist) yarns. Crepe yarn tends to have a tighter twist than standard yarns. The twist in the crepe yarns puckers the fabric slightly in both directions after weaving, giving it some stretch and a slightly rough feel.

== Characteristics ==
Chiffon is a lightweight fabric which is associated with elegance and luxury; it drapes well and has a shimmery and sheer appearance. Under a magnifying glass, chiffon resembles a fine net or mesh, which gives it some transparency.

Chiffon can be produced out of natural or synthetic fibres. Silk chiffon was very expensive, and it is with the development of synthetic chiffon, such as nylon chiffon, polyester chiffon, and rayon chiffon, that chiffon became more accessible and more popular for common usage.

Since chiffon is a light-weight fabric which frays easily, bound or French seams must be used to stop the fabric from fraying.

=== Natural fibres ===
Early chiffon was made purely from silk and was very expensive; when used in fashion, it was associated with high status. Silk chiffon displays colours beautifully since silk fibres absorb dyes well. Chiffon also drapes well, adding structure to the clothing item it is formed into. Silk chiffon needs to be dry cleaned.

In China, silk chiffon made of raw silk was known as xiāo (Chinese: 绡), which was also the name of raw silk.

Chiffon could also be made out of cotton.

=== Synthetic fibres ===
In 1938, a nylon chiffon was invented; this was followed by the creation of polyester chiffon in 1958, which became immensely popular due to its resilience and low cost.

Chiffon can also be produced out of rayon.

== Usage ==
In modern Western fashion, chiffon is most commonly used in evening wear, especially as an overlay, for giving an elegant and floating appearance to the gown. It is also a popular fabric used in blouses, ribbons, scarves and lingerie.

In India, chiffon is primarily used to make sarees and dupattas.

== Gallery ==
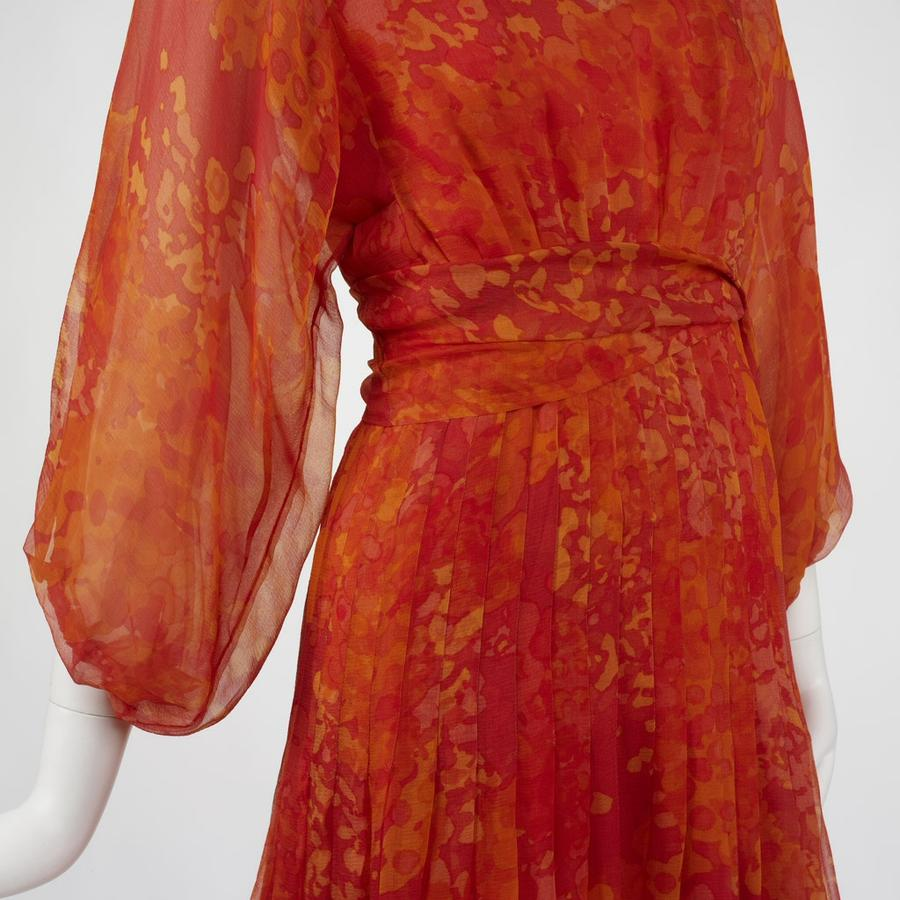
1970s Givenchy cocktail dress, orange printed silk chiffon

== Similar items ==
Chiffon is smoother and more lustrous than the similar fabric georgette.

Chiffon is more flowing and airy when draped than organza, which is stiffer.

Chiffon is more moveable and flimsy, while tulle is more firm with a mesh type appearance.

== See also ==
- Chiffon cake
- Taffeta
- Habutai
