= Grosgrain =

Plain-woven fabric with weft-wise ribbing, often woven in ribbon widths

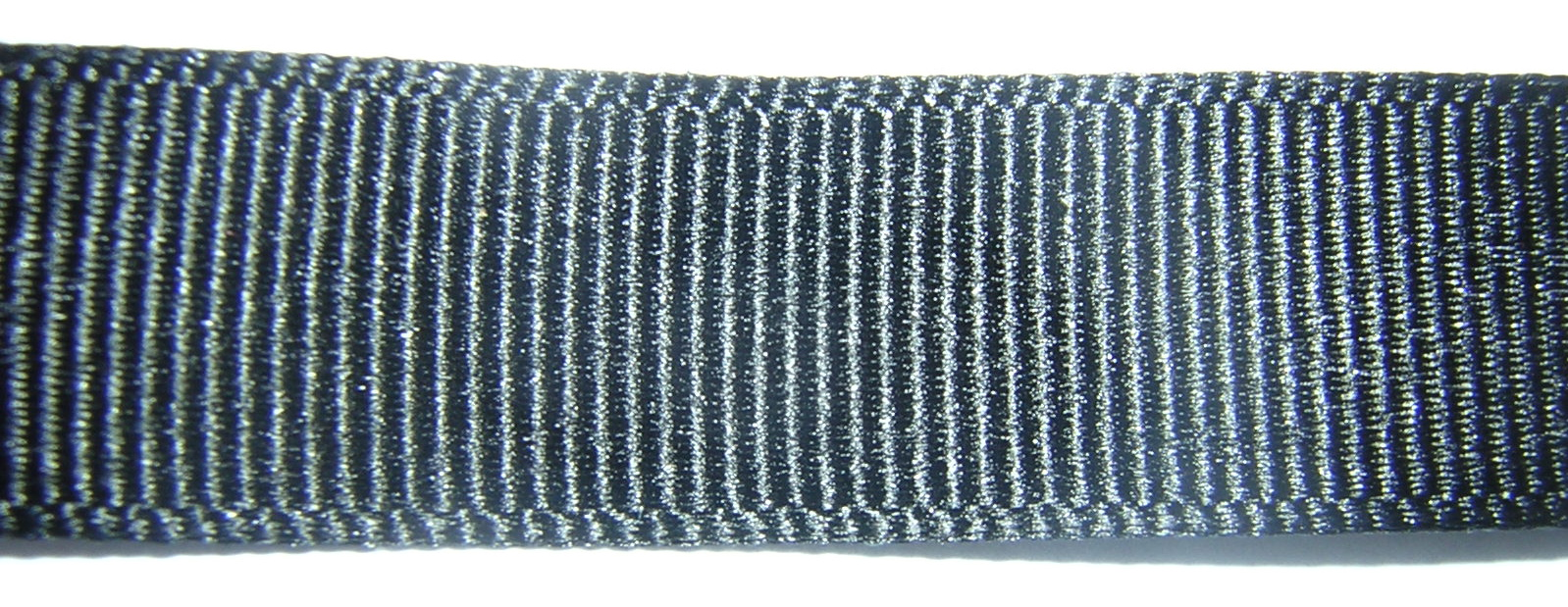
A close-up of a piece of grosgrain ribbon. Note the ribs that go across the ribbon.

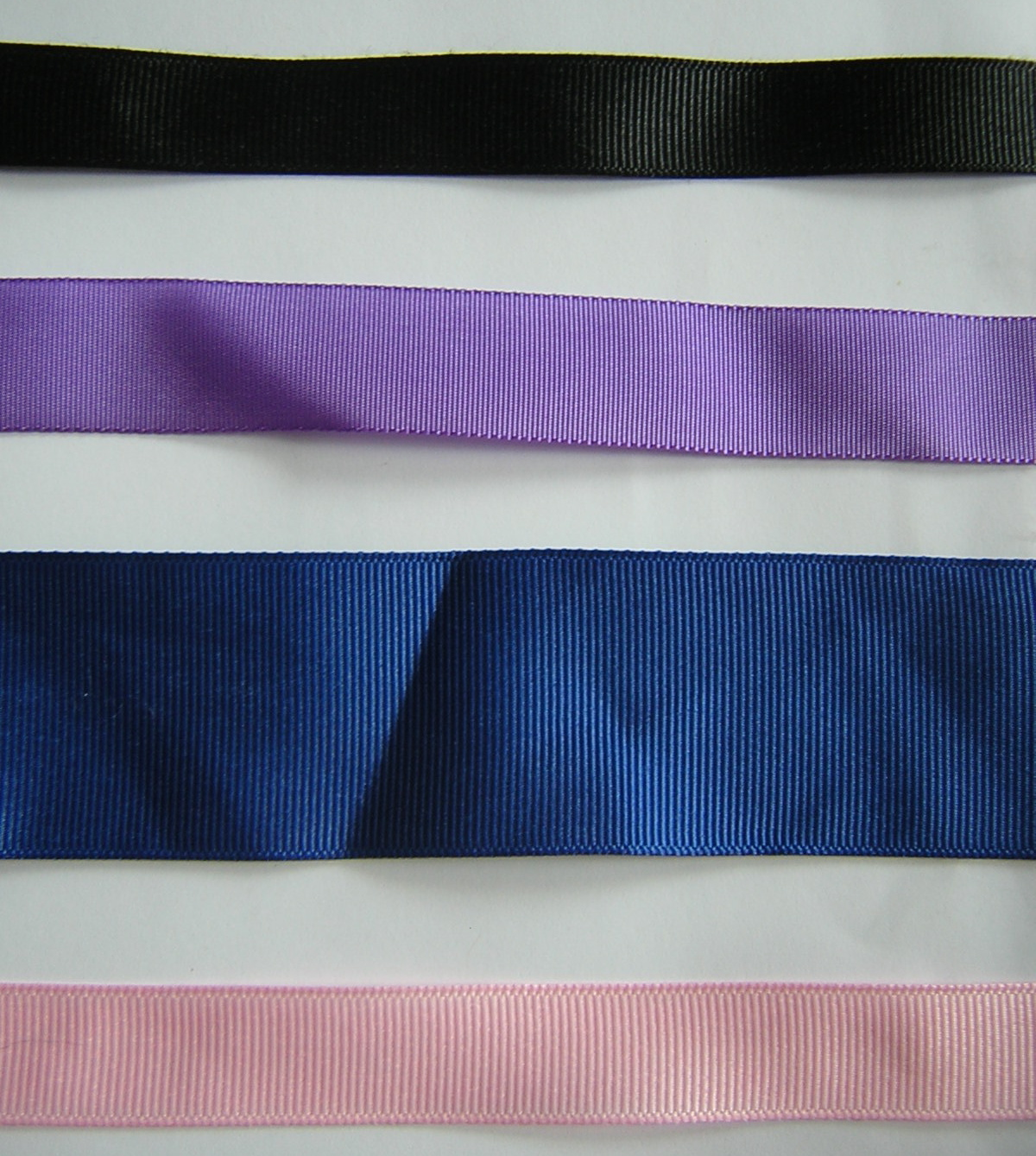
Grosgrain ribbons in various colors and widths

Grosgrain (Note: /ˈɡroʊɡreɪn/ GROH-grayn) (from the French gros grain, "coarse grain") is a type of fabric or ribbon defined by the fact that its weft is heavier than its warp, creating prominent transverse ribs. Grosgrain is a plain weave corded (Note: Grosgrain is known as a "corded" fabric as the weft, being thicker than the warp, resembles a fine cord running through the fabric.) fabric, with heavier cords than poplin but lighter than faille, and is known for being a firm, close-woven, fine-corded fabric. Grosgrain has a dull appearance, with little luster in comparison to many fabric weaves, such as satin, often used for ribbons; however, it is comparatively very strong. Grosgrain fabric is most commonly available in black, but grosgrain ribbon comes in a large variety of colors and patterns. The ribbon is very similar to Petersham ribbon in its appearance, but it does not have the ability to follow the curves of a surface or edge the way that the latter does.

"Grosgrain" is commonly used to refer to a heavy, stiff ribbon of silk or nylon woven via taffeta weave using a heavy weft, which results in distinct transverse ribs. Historically, grosgrain was made from wool, silk, or a combination of fibers such as silk and wool or silk and mohair. When a combination of fibers was used, the result was sometimes given the name grogram, silk mohair, gros de Tours or gros de Naples.

== Moire ==
Moire is a waved or watered effect produced especially on grosgrain silk and woolen moreen via engraved rollers and high pressure on carded material. The result is a peculiar luster which works best when made from a corded fabric like grosgrain.

During the Middle Ages, moire was held in high esteem and was, as currently, used for women's dresses, for capes, and for facings, trimmings, etc.

== Use in clothing ==
=== History ===
Throughout the 17th century, grosgrain fabric was used as the fabric body (corpus) for many garments, including waistcoats, jackets, petticoats, breeches, sleeves, jerkins and many other items of clothing, as a cheaper alternative for the lower socio-economic demographic than fine-woven silk or wool. Factories in America started to produce grosgrain silk in the late 19th century.

Throughout the 1920s, the term grosgrain seems to have remained true to original definition as a garment fabric. However, during the 1920s, it fell out of favor as a garment fabric, and was defined identically to contemporary terminology as a grosgrain ribbon.

=== Structural uses ===
Lustrous grosgrain is used extensively to join female semi-detached clothing articles such as bodices to skirts and similar, where this necessary joint may be visible. Ribbed grosgrain may be used similarly to twill tape for internal gussets and reinforcements. Grosgrain ribbon is often used for facings and for waistbands. McCall's Sewing Book states: "grosgrain ribbon is used with any heavy fabric to reduce bulk", though it may be the word "bulk" is used in the sense of outward appearance, rather than actual mass. McCall elaborates: "grosgrain is used to finish the back of novelty braid or to face the back of any fabric belt."

=== Evening wear ===
As a more subtle option to lustrous satin, grosgrain is very popular with evening wear, used on the facings of lapels of most dress coats and high-end dinner jackets and tuxedos. Grosgrain is traditionally used to hem and highlight the cut of lapels, collars and visible outermost edges of the formal frock coat and the later morning coat. Grosgrain is preferred over satin for practicality—it is more durable than silk or satin, as the fabric does not snag as easily. Grosgrain is also used for matching accessories such as bow ties and cummerbunds, though these are often in barathea to complement the main suiting.

=== Millinery ===
Grosgrain is also used in millinery. Grosgrain ribbons are popular for use in ribbon decorations for hats, however, grosgrain is most notably used in top hats, fedora hats, and opera hats, or as the trimming band on the Homburg.

== Other uses ==
=== Book-binding ===
Grosgrain fabric and ribbon are common structural fabrics for the joining or reinforcement of spines or sheaves in fine commercial and hobby bookbinding and book restoration.

=== Graduation leis ===
When it comes to graduation leis, various types of ribbons can be used to create decorative accents and secure the flowers or other elements together. Grosgrain ribbon has a ribbed texture and is slightly thicker than satin ribbon. It provides a more textured and structured appearance to the lei. Grosgrain ribbon is available in various colors and patterns.

=== Cargo and packing use ===
A particular characteristic of grosgrain ribbon is that the thicker weft resists longitudinal curling, and so it exerts an even pressure when tied around crushable materials. Nylon grosgrain is often used as heavy-duty webbing or binding around luggage, packs, messenger bags and other heavy-use "soft" goods. It is also used for securing cargo. It can be dyed and is available in a variety of colours, though it is typically dyed black.

Early seat belts and military webbing during World War II was typically made of hemp, jute or linen grosgrain.

=== Craft ===
Grosgrain made out of cotton or low-cost synthetic fibres such as polyester are very common for gift-wrap ribbons, or for decorating and ornamenting scrapbooks and greeting cards. Grosgrain ribbon is used for a variety of different crafts as well, from bead making, to book-binding, trimming or embellishing, as well as a multitude of other uses. Grosgrain ribbon is the primary ribbon material used in the hair bow industry.

=== Lanyards ===
Grosgrain woven from cotton or low-cost synthetic fibres such as polyester are very popular for use as lanyard, straps, and are often sold printed for use by large corporate companies as a marketing or branding tool.

=== Percussion ===
Polyester grosgrain in a 5/8 in (16 mm) width can be used as the tensioning material attaching the snares of a snare drum to the throw-off mechanism, with the ribbing providing good insurance against slippage. Some musicians use it in an attempt to lessen sympathetic snare buzz from external sources, as it will hold the tab ends of the snares closer to the head than string, providing more damping than mylar straps.

== See also ==
- Petersham ribbon
- Faille
