= Marceline (fabric) =

Type of fabric

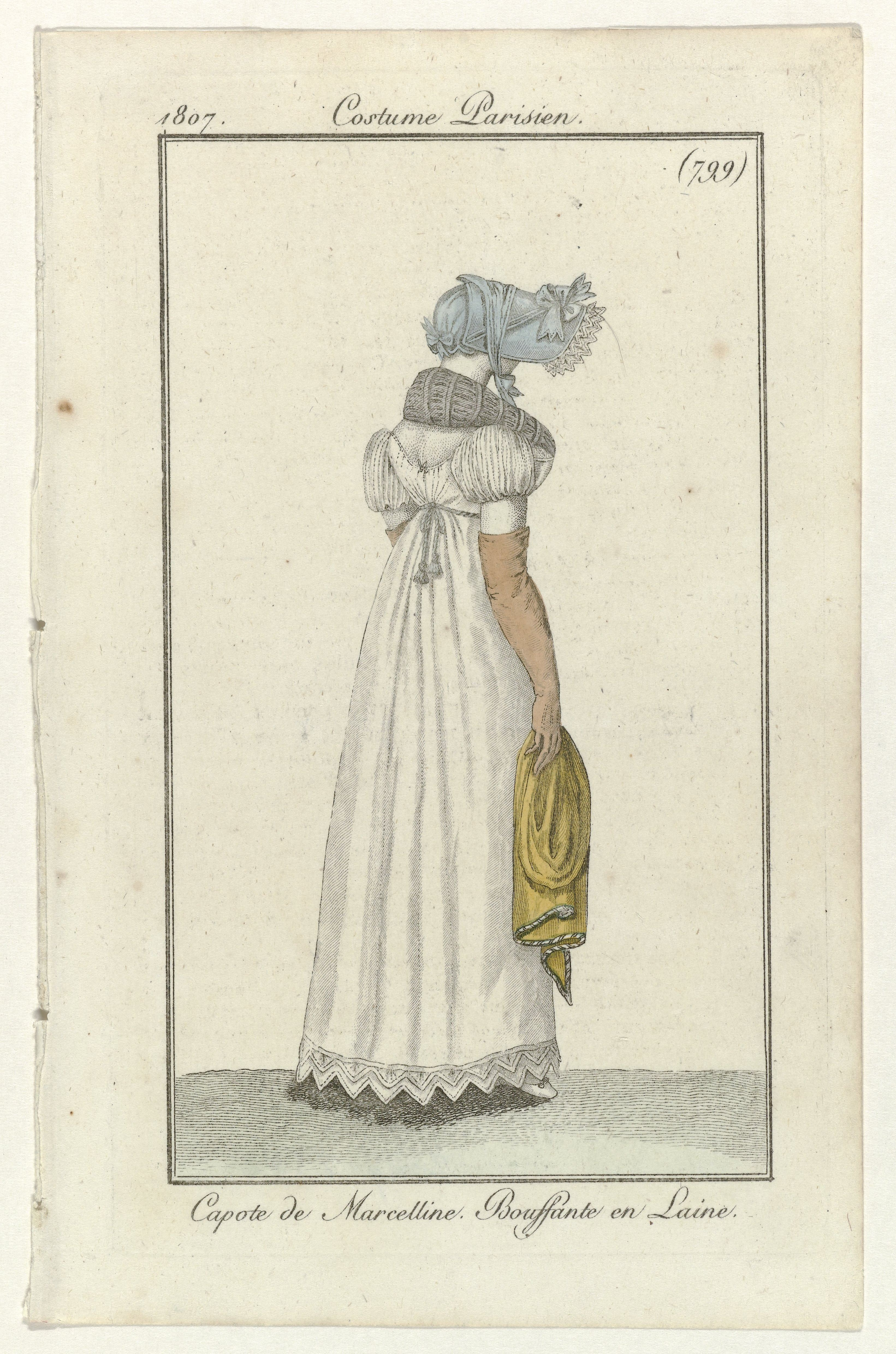
Marceline cap illustrated in Costume Parisien, 1807.

Marceline (sometimes marcelline or merceline) is a type of grain fabric made from taffeta-silk but more pronounced than plain taffeta. Its main usage is in the linings in hatmaking or in women's dresses but there are other applications.

Its threads are crossed "in groups in a two-pass report, are individually introduced in the meshes of the heights so that they are fixed exactly and parallel in their crosses with the weft".

The 1893 US Supreme Court case Cadwalader v. Wanamaker addressed the question of whether marcelines or "chinas" should be considered trimmings for tariff purposes. It was classified by the US as a sheer fabric.

In "Journées de Lecture", Marcel Proust recalls having a marceline quilt in his room "...la jonchée de couvre-pieds en marceline...".
