= Warp printing =

Method of fabric printing

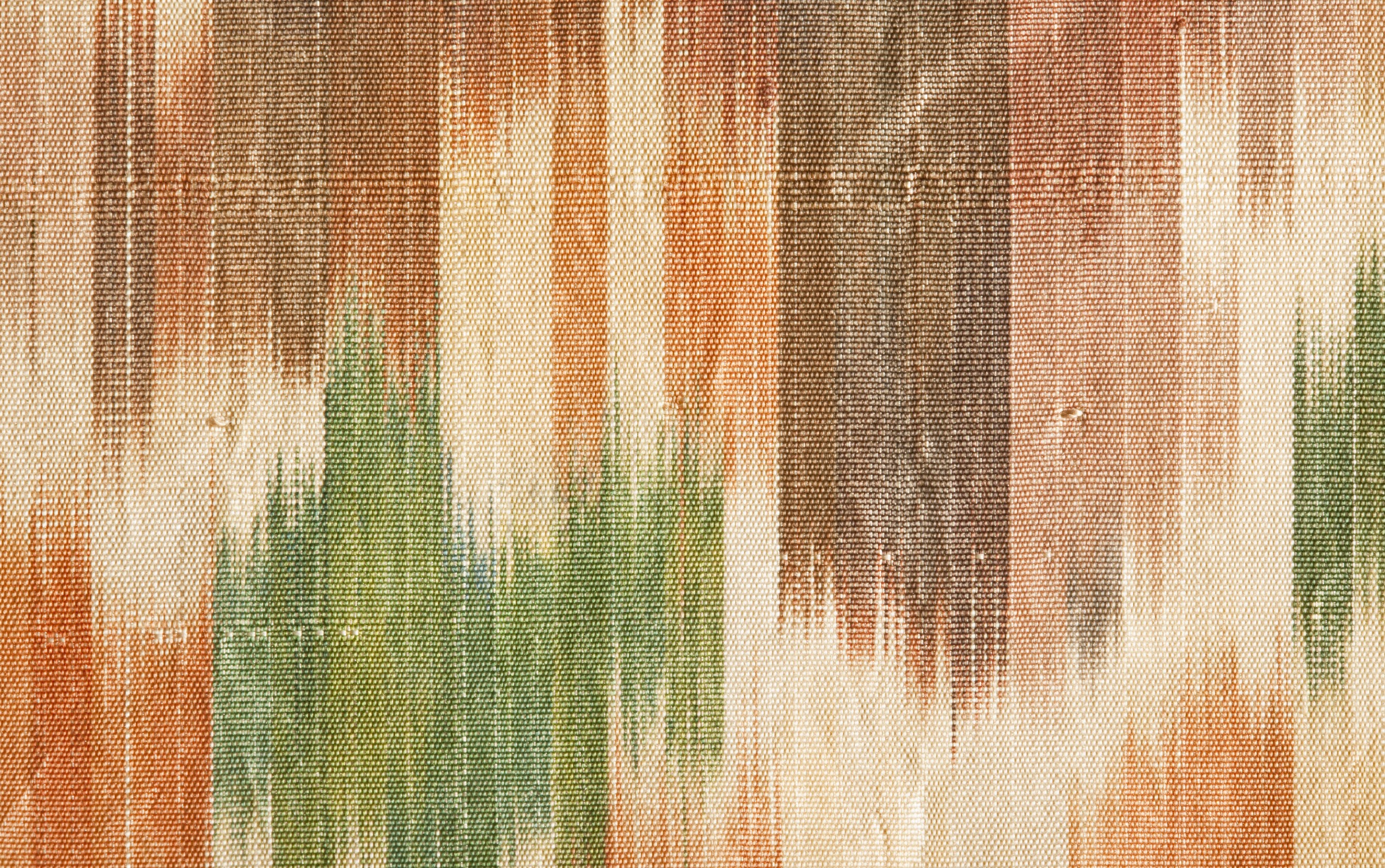
Chiné silk, French, 1760s. LACMA, M.60.36.1

Warp printing is a fabric production method which combines textile printing and weaving to create a distinctively patterned fabric, usually in silk. The warp threads of the fabric are printed before weaving to create a softly blurred, vague pastel-coloured pattern. It was particularly fashionable in the eighteenth century for summer wear.

The silk and taffeta fabrics produced by this technique have a variety of names, including chiné, Pompadour taffeta (after Madame de Pompadour) and chiné à la branche. Chiné velvet was also possible, although the technique was very difficult and expensive and it was only made in a few places in France in the eighteenth century.

== See also ==
- Ikat
- Shot silk
