= Petersham ribbon =

Type of fabric ribbon

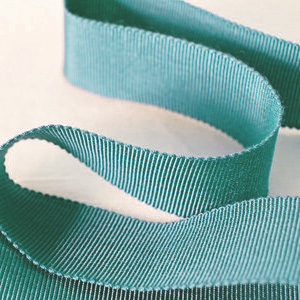
A length of Petersham ribbon

Petersham ribbon, also called Petersham facing or simply Petersham, is a thick, stiff, flexible corded ribbon usually made out of either cotton, rayon, viscose, or a cotton/rayon or viscose blend of fibres and is used as facing by milliners and tailors. Petersham is frequently watered on both sides and comes with a scalloped edge. It is woven so that once steamed, it will take on and support a particular curve of fabric. This makes it useful for obtaining a smooth edge on the brim of a hat, for example, without forming puckers or wrinkles which would result from the use of traditional flat ribbon or other flat fabric. It is also useful as an alternative to bias tape for making fabric conform closely to the shape of the body wearing it— in a corset, for example, or along the waistline of a pair of trousers or a skirt. Petersham is utilized in couture sewing as a form of interfacing as a way to stabilize waistbands.

Petersham is very similar to grosgrain ribbon in appearance: both have closely spaced horizontal ridges, but Petersham has a flexible picot edge allowing it to be shaped with an iron, whereas grosgrain cannot be shaped this way.

Petersham is named after the eighteenth century English lord Viscount Petersham who invented an overcoat and breeches made of a special heavy woollen cloth with a round nap surface. For this reason, "Petersham" is often (but not always) capitalized.

== See also ==
- Grosgrain
