= Ferraiolo =

Cape of Catholic priests

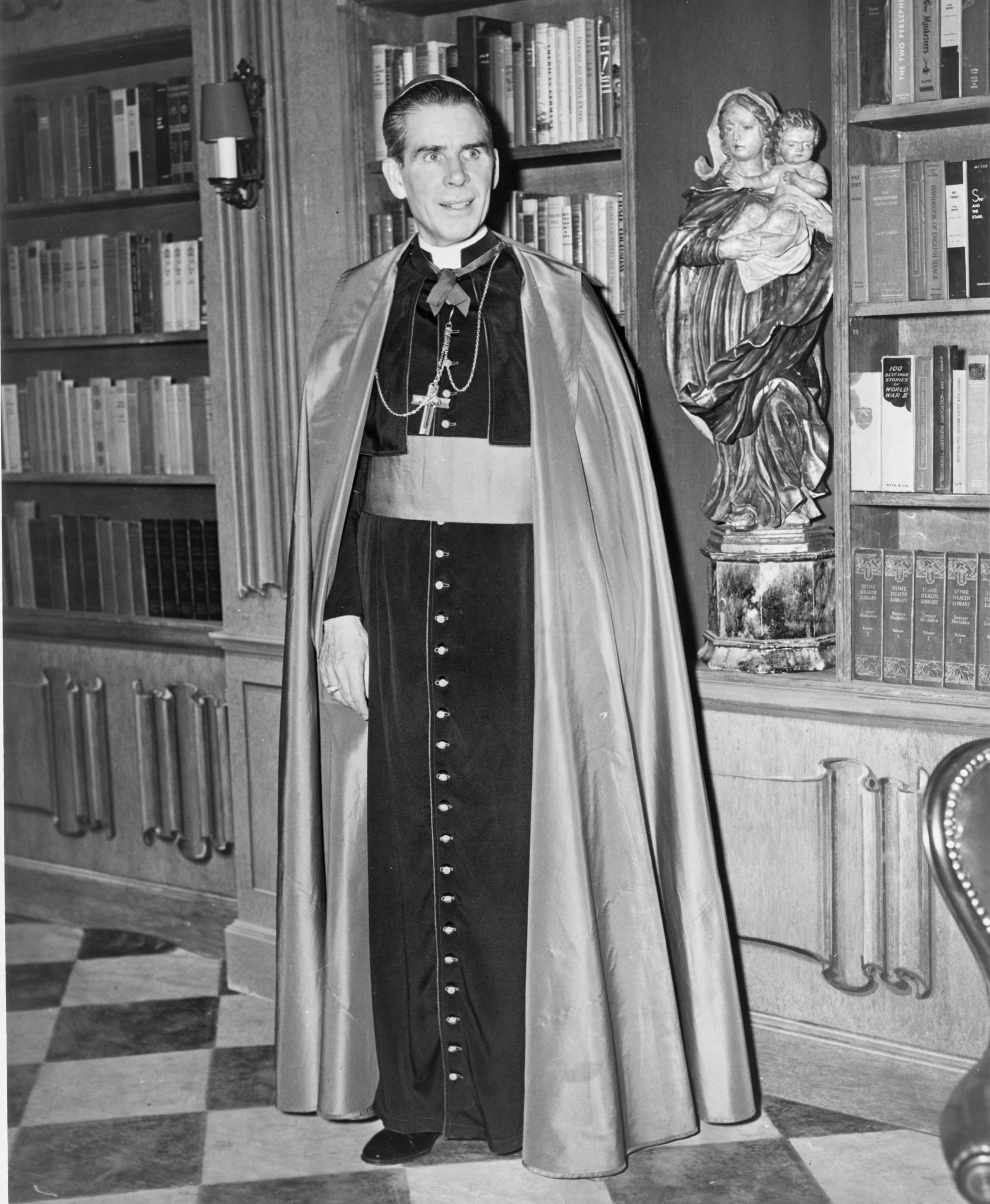
Blessed Archbishop Fulton J. Sheen wearing the ferraiolo, 1952.

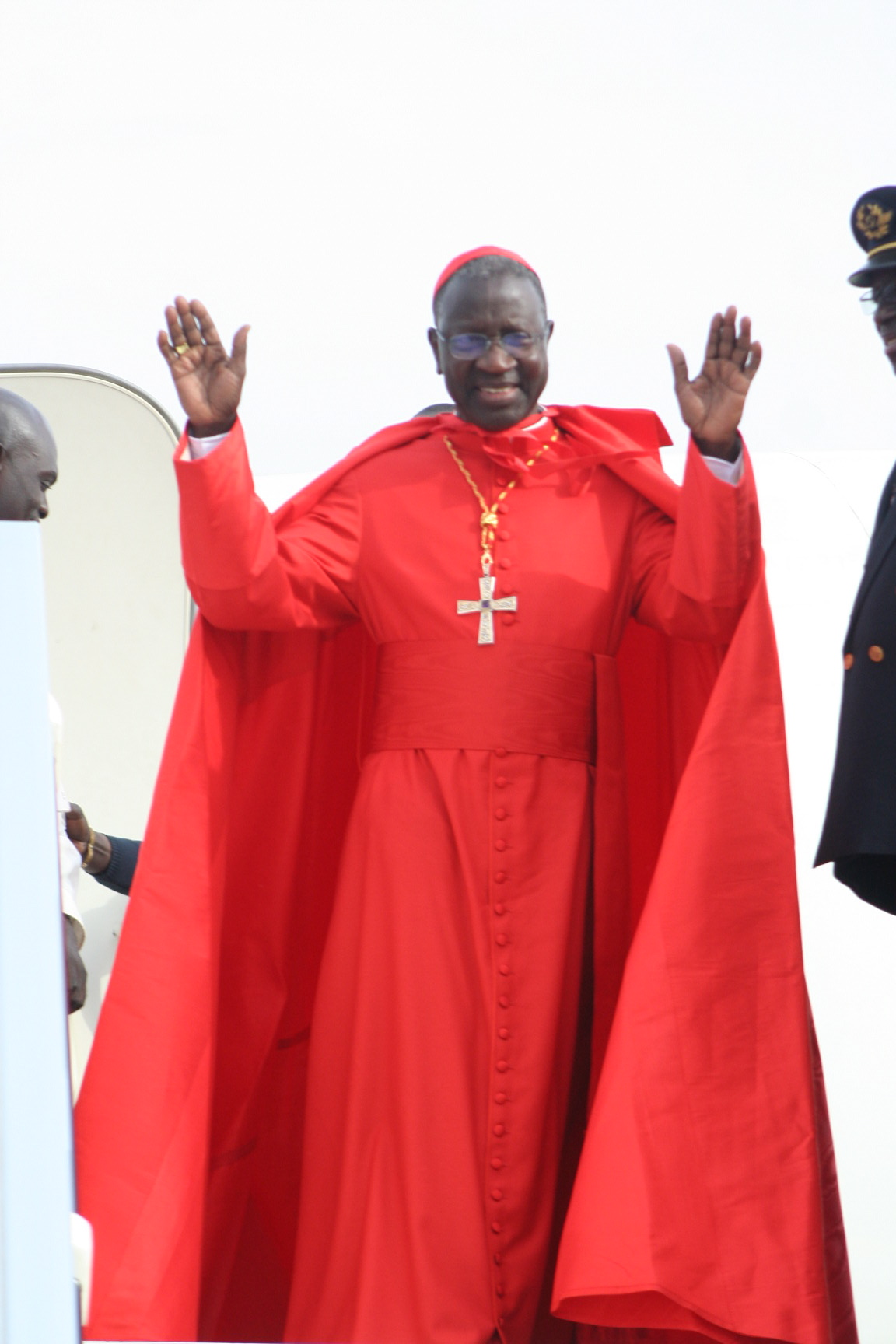
Cardinal Sarr of Dakar wearing his ferraiolo of watered silk

The ferraiolo (also ferraiuolo, ferraiolone) is a type of cape traditionally worn by clergy in the Catholic Church on formal, non-liturgical occasions. It can be worn over the shoulders, or behind them, extends in length to the ankles, is tied in a bow by narrow strips of cloth at the front, and does not have any 'trim' or piping on it.

== History ==
The ferraiolo originated as a knee-length item of clothing for Roman nobility. It became a church garment in the 15th century when colours were associated with ranks in the church hierarchy.

== Colour and material ==
The colour of the ferraiolo is determined by the rank of the cleric, being black for secular priests, violet for protonotaries apostolic and bishops, and scarlet for cardinals.

Before 1969, members of religious orders could use a ferraiolo that matched the color of their habit. The colors also changed during sede vacante.

Cardinals, and patriarchs who are not cardinals, use a ferraiolo of watered silk. Archbishops, bishops and protonotaries may use silk but not watered silk, unless specifically permitted. Lesser prelates may use faille but should use wool and wear the ferraiolo behind the shoulders.

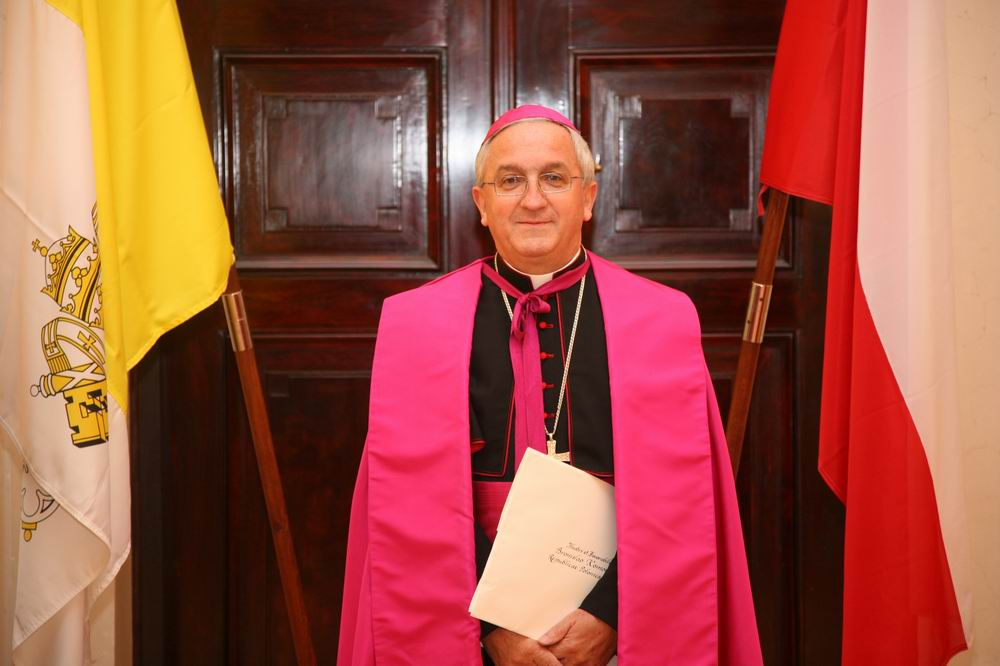
Archbishop Celestino Migliore, Apostolic Nuncio to Poland, wearing his purple ferraiolo

== Use ==
Pope Paul VI encouraged wearing the ferraiolo at formal, non-liturgical occasions.

The Pope may use a cape but does not wear a ferraiolo.
