= Faille =

Type of corded fabric

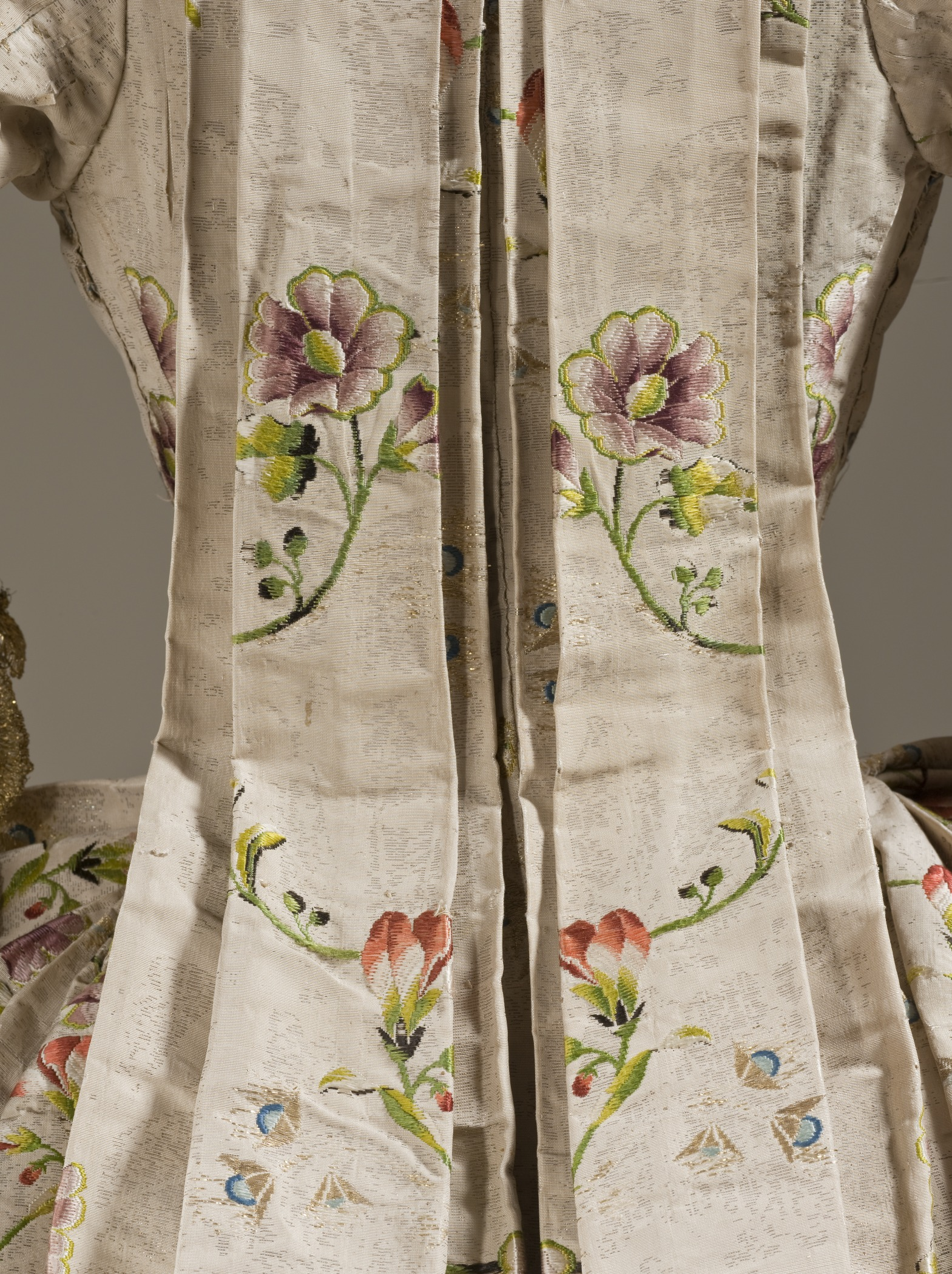
Silk plain weave (faille) robe, circa 1760–1765, with silk and metallic-thread supplementary weft patterning, and metallic lace trim.

Faille is a type of cloth with flat ribs, often made in silk. It has a softer texture than grosgrain, with heavier and wider cords or ribs. Weft yarns are heavier than warp, and it is manufactured in plain weaving. It was especially popular in the 19th century.

== Material ==
Faille was primarily made with silk, variations with cotton and wool were also there. A French silk variant was called ''Faille Française.'' The similar grosgrain has been described as a "firm, stiff, closely woven, corded fabric. The cords are heavier and closer than those in poplin, more round than those in faille."

=== Variations ===
Faille fabric is characterized by its prominent rib and is manufactured by employing fine filament yarns in the warp and heavy spun yarns in the filling. Typically, it is a heavyweight fabric, although lighter weight variations of faille, known as tissue failles.

== Use ==
Faille was a fabric with lower luster, better drape and feel in comparison to counterparts like Grosgrain. It was used in ladies' dresses, suits and spring coats. Tissue faille was once acknowledged as a trademark fabric and widely utilized in the creation of blouses.

== See also ==
- Moire (fabric)
