= Taffeta =

Silk or rayon plain woven fabric

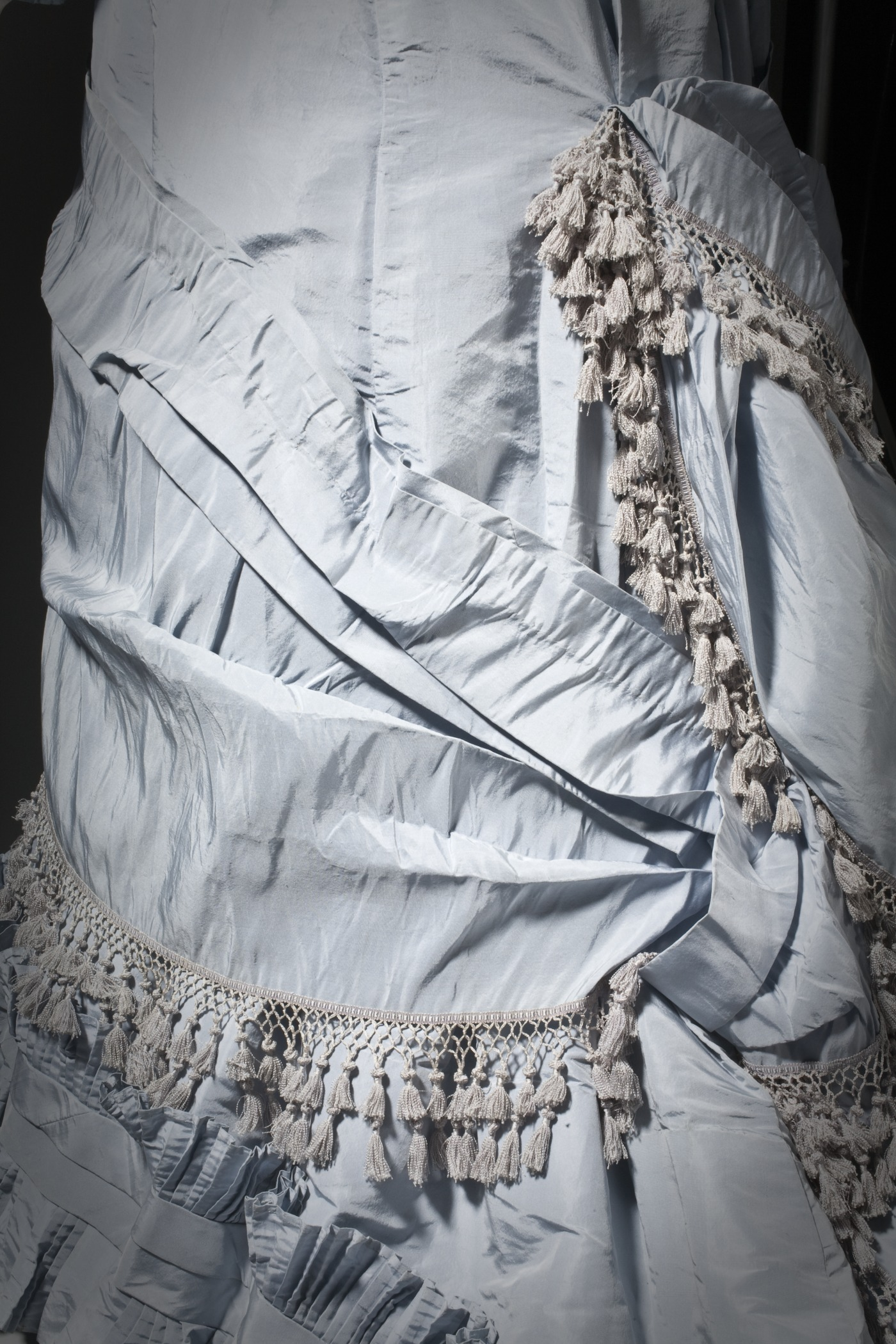
Detail of a dress made of silk taffeta, c. 1880

Taffeta (archaically spelled taffety or taffata) is a crisp, smooth, plain woven fabric made from silk, nylon, cuprammonium rayons, acetate, or polyester. The word came into Middle English via Old French and Old Italian, which borrowed the Persian word tāfta (تافته), which means "silk" or "linen cloth". As clothing, it is used in ball gowns, wedding dresses, and corsets, and in interior decoration, for curtains or wallcovering. It tends to yield a stiff cloth with a starched appearance that holds its shape better than many other fabrics and does not sag or drape.

Silk taffeta is of two types: yarn-dyed and piece-dyed. Piece-dyed taffeta is often used in linings and is quite soft. Yarn-dyed taffeta is much stiffer and is often used in evening dresses. Shot silk taffeta was one of the most highly-sought forms of Byzantine silk, and may have been the fabric known as purpura.

== Production ==
Modern taffeta was first woven in Italy and France and until the 1950s in Japan. Warp-printed taffeta or chiné, mainly made in France from the 18th century onwards, is sometimes called "pompadour taffeta" after Madame de Pompadour. Today, most raw silk taffeta is produced in India and Pakistan. There, even in the modern period, handlooms have been widely used, but since the 1990s, taffeta has been largely produced on mechanical looms in the Bangalore area. From the 1970s until the 1990s, the Jiangsu province of China produced fine silk taffetas: these were less flexible than those from Indian mills, however, and the latter continue to dominate production. Other countries in South-East and Western Asia also produce silk taffeta, but these products tend not yet to be equal in quality or competitiveness to those from India.

== Historical and current uses ==
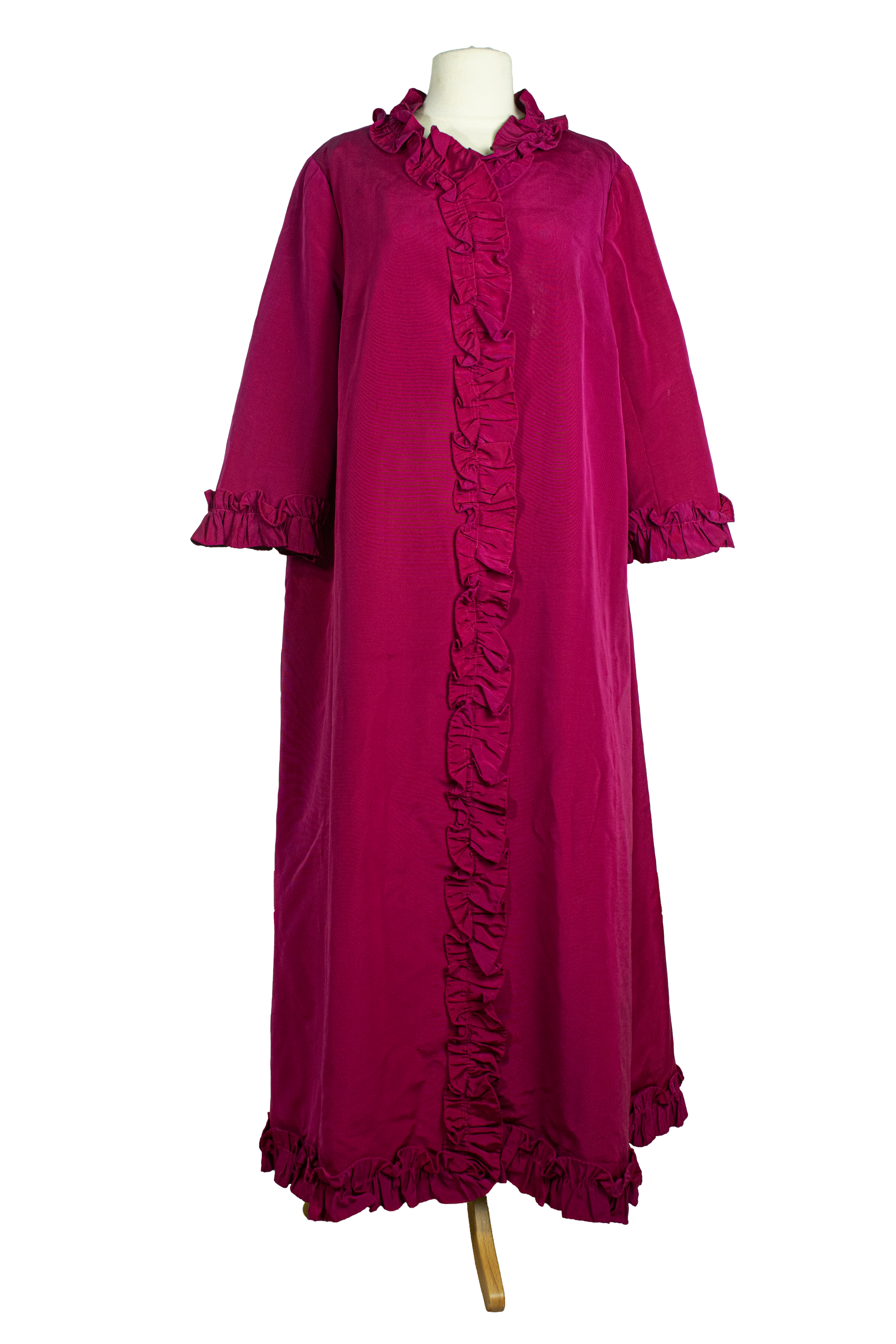
Pink taffeta evening coat designed by Sybil Connolly

Taffeta has seen use for purposes other than clothing fabric, including the following:

- On November 4, 1782, taffeta was used by Joseph Montgolfier of France to construct a small, cube-shaped balloon. This was the beginning of many experiments using taffeta balloons by the Montgolfier brothers, and led to the first known human flight in a lighter-than-air craft.
- Synthetic fibre forms of taffeta have been used to simulate the structure of blood vessels.
- Tabby cats were so named in the 1600s because of their resemblance to a tabby, a type of striped silk taffeta.
- It was associated with prostitution during the English Renaissance. Examples include the references in William Shakespeare's plays: "As fit as ten groats is for the hand of an attorney, as your French crown for your taffeta punk," says the Clown in All's Well That Ends Well; Prince Hal's reference to Sir John Falstaff's "fair hot wench in flame-coloured taffeta" in Henry IV, Part 1; Boyet's dismissal of "Beauties no richer than rich taffeta" in Love's Labour's Lost; and Feste's insult in Twelfth Night, or What You Will, "The tailor make thy doublet of changeable taffeta, for thy mind is a very opal."
- Marceline is a related fabric.

== See also ==
- Tiffany (silk)
- Chiffon (fabric)
- Habutai
