= Habutai =

Lghtweight, sheer, plain-woven silk fabric

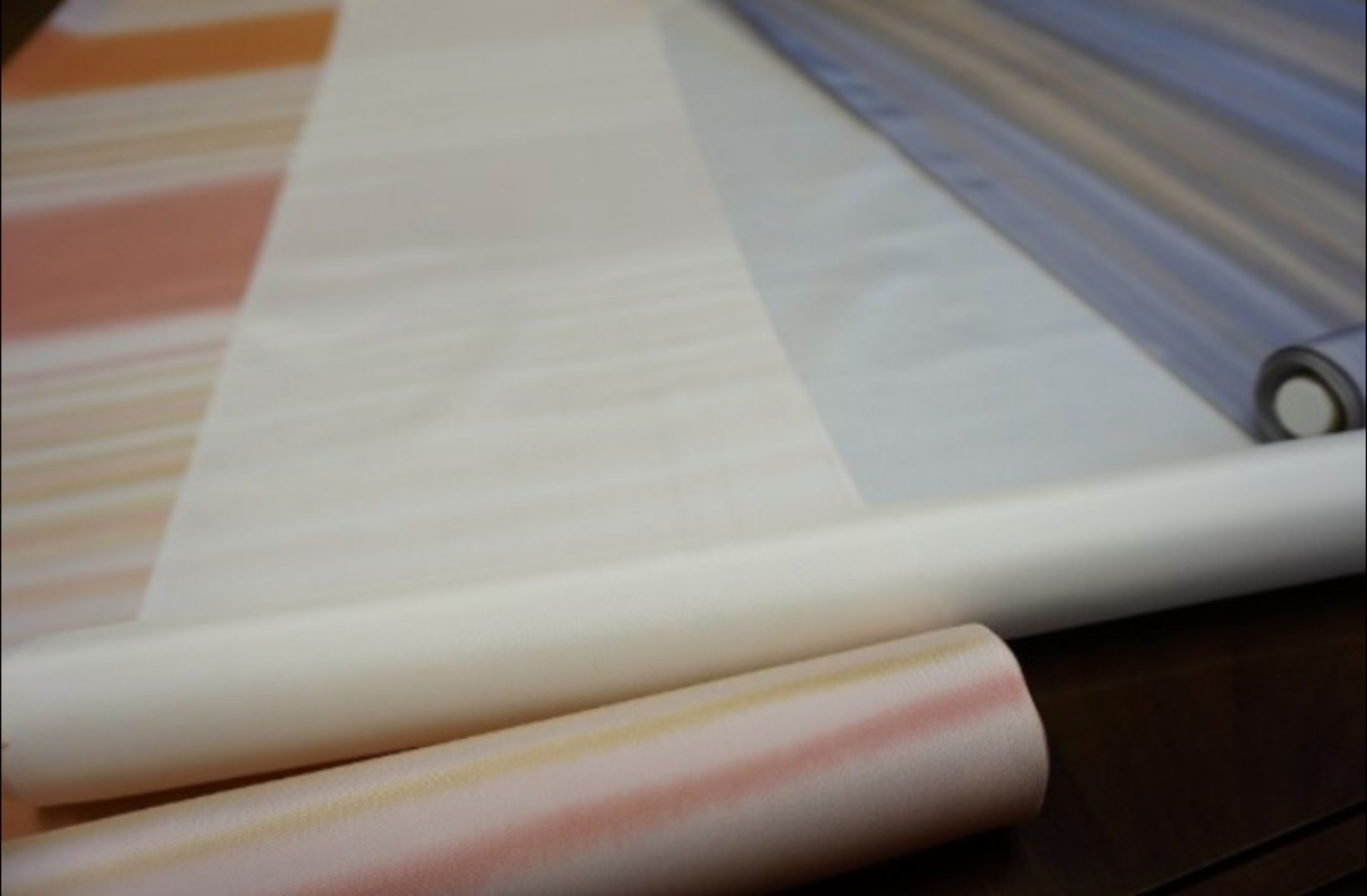

Habutai (from the Japanese habutae (羽二重), literally "feather-two-layer", also spelled habotai or habutae) is one of the most basic plain weaves of silk fabric. While it was traditionally woven in Japan, most habutai is today woven in China. It is normally a lining silk but can also be used for T-shirts, lampshades, summer blouses or very light lingerie. It is quite easy to dye and can be found in many stores.

Like other kinds of silks, habutai comes in a variety of weights (thicknesses) which is measured in mommes (abbreviated mm). A lightweight and sheer habutai silk might be 8 mommes ("8mm"); a 16mm habutai is considered quite thick.

Habutai is a lightweight, shimmering material once used mainly for making silk kimono. It is sheer and often has an ivory color.

== See also ==
- Chiffon (fabric)
- Taffeta
