= Moire (fabric) =

Fabric with a wavy appearance

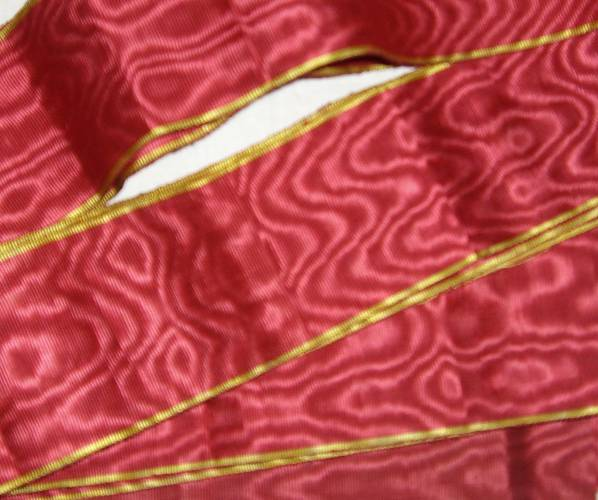
Moire ribbons

Moire (/ˈmwɑːr/ or /ˈmɔːr/), less often moiré, is a textile with a wavy (watered) appearance produced mainly from silk, but also wool, cotton, and rayon. The watered appearance is usually created by the finishing technique called calendering. Moiré effects are also achieved by certain weaves, such as varying the tension in the warp and weft of the weave. Silk treated in this way is sometimes called watered silk.

== Method of production ==
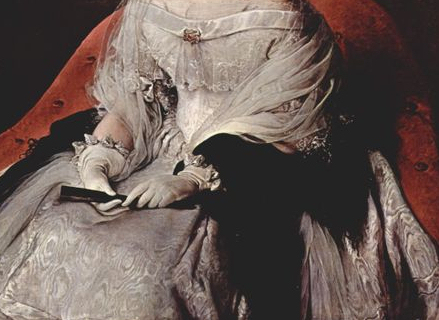
Gown of moire or watered silk, 1840–44

Moire is produced from two distinct methods of finishing. Calendering produces the true moire, known as "moire antique" and "moire Anglaise", which is a purely physical phenomenon. In calendering, the fabric is folded lengthwise in half with the face side inward, and with the two selvedges running together side by side. To produce moire, ribbed rollers are used, and the ribs produce the watermark effect. The rollers polish the surface and make the fabric smoother and more lustrous. High temperatures and pressure are used as well, and the fabric is often dampened before being run through the rollers. The end result is a peculiar luster resulting from the divergent reflection of the light rays on the material, a divergence brought about by compressing and flattening the warp and filling threads in places, thereby forming a surface which reflects light differently. The weft threads also are moved slightly.

Changeable moire is a term for fabric with a warp of one color and a weft of another, which gives different effects in different lights. Examples include shot silk.

Moire fabric is more delicate than fabric of the same type that has not gone through the calendering process. Also, contact with water removes the watermark and causes staining. Moire feels thin, glossy and papery due to the calendering process. Generally moire is made out of fabrics with a good body and defined ribs, such as grosgrain. Fabrics with defined ribs show the watered effect better than smooth fabrics like satin. Taffeta also works well. Fabrics with defined enough ribs can be calendered with smooth rollers and produce a moire finish; however generally the rollers have ribs that correspond to the grain of the fabric. The moire effect may be obtained on silk, worsted, or cotton fabrics, though it is impossible to develop it on anything other than a grained or fine corded weave.

Moire can also be produced by running fabric through engraved copper rollers.

== Etymology ==
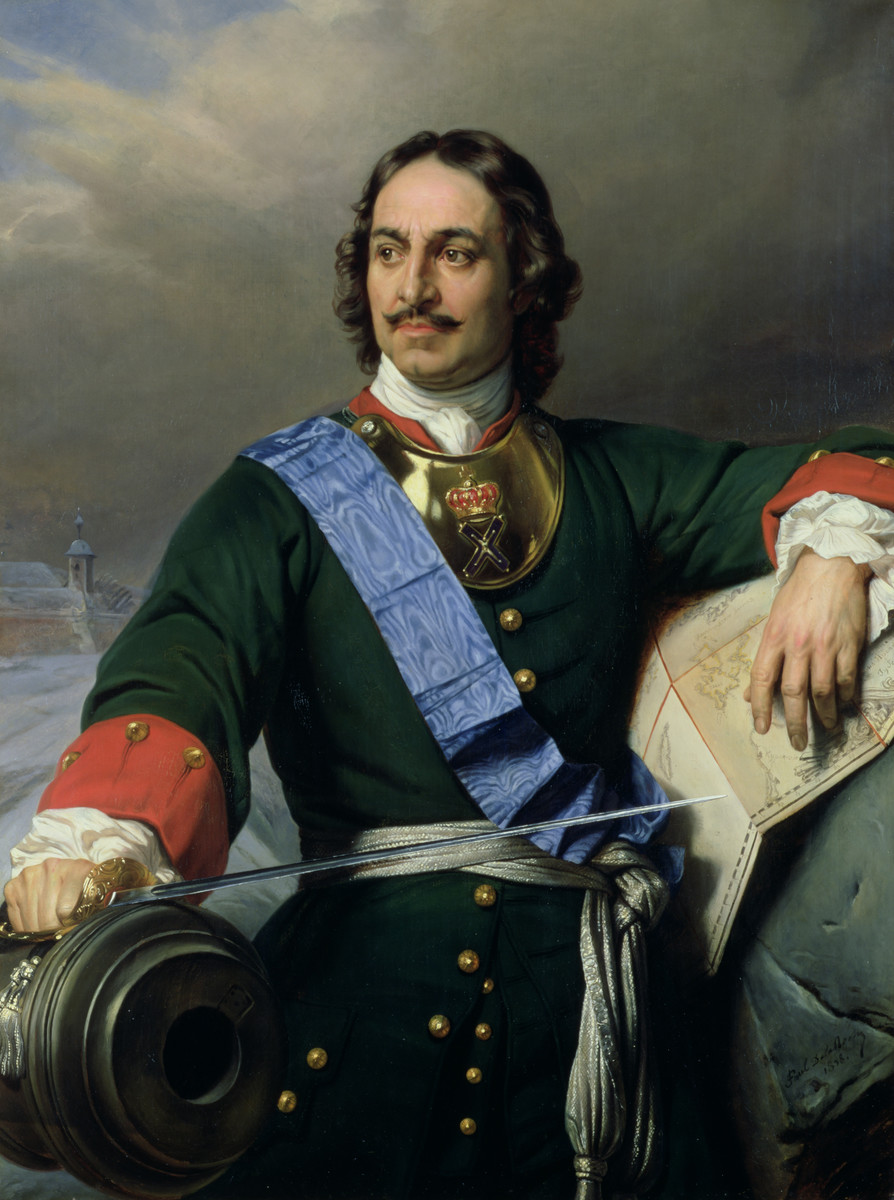
Peter the Great wearing the insignia of the Order of St. Andrew and a moire ribbon sash

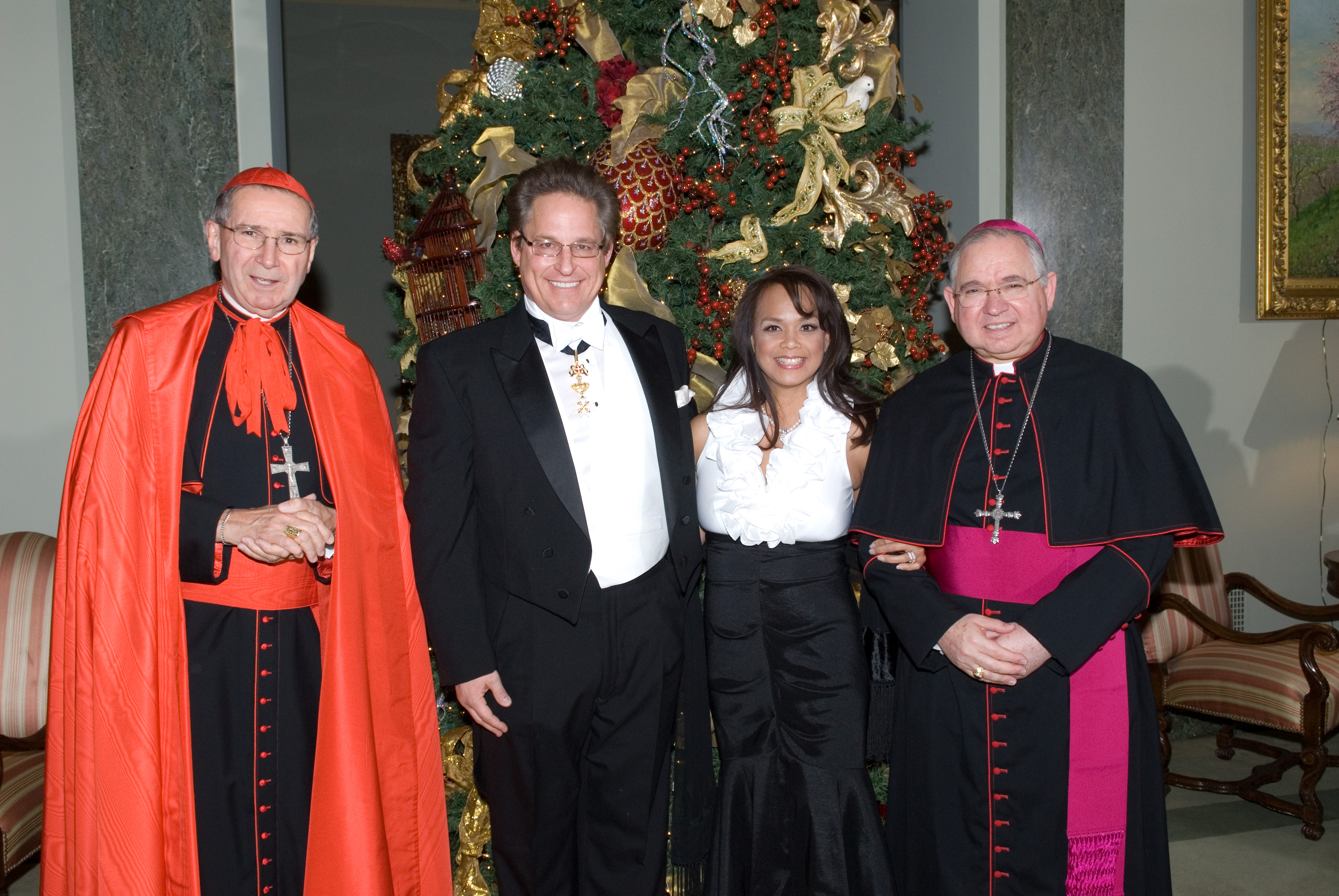
Roger Cardinal Mahony (left) wearing a ferraiolo of watered silk

In French, the adjective moiré (in use since at least 1823) derives from the earlier verb moirer, "to produce a watered textile by weaving or pressing". Moirer, in turn, is a variation of the word mouaire which is an adoption of the English mohair (in use since at least 1570). Mohair comes from the Arabic mukhayyar (مُخَيَّر, lit. "chosen"), a cloth made from the wool of the Angora goat. Mukhayyar (مُخَيَّر) descends from khayyara (خيّر, lit. "he chose"). "Chosen" is meant in the sense of "a choice, or excellent, cloth".

By 1660 (in the writings of Samuel Pepys), moire (or moyre) had been adopted in English.

== History ==
During the Middle Ages, moire was held in high esteem and was, as currently, used for women’s dresses, capes, and for facings, trimmings, etc. Originally moire was only made of silk taffeta; however, now cotton and synthetic fibers such as viscose (rayon) are also used. Moire has been worn throughout the late 19th century and early 20th century, and is still used for evening dresses and wedding gowns.

== See also ==
- Moiré pattern
