= Shot silk =

Fabric woven such that it produces an iridescent appearance

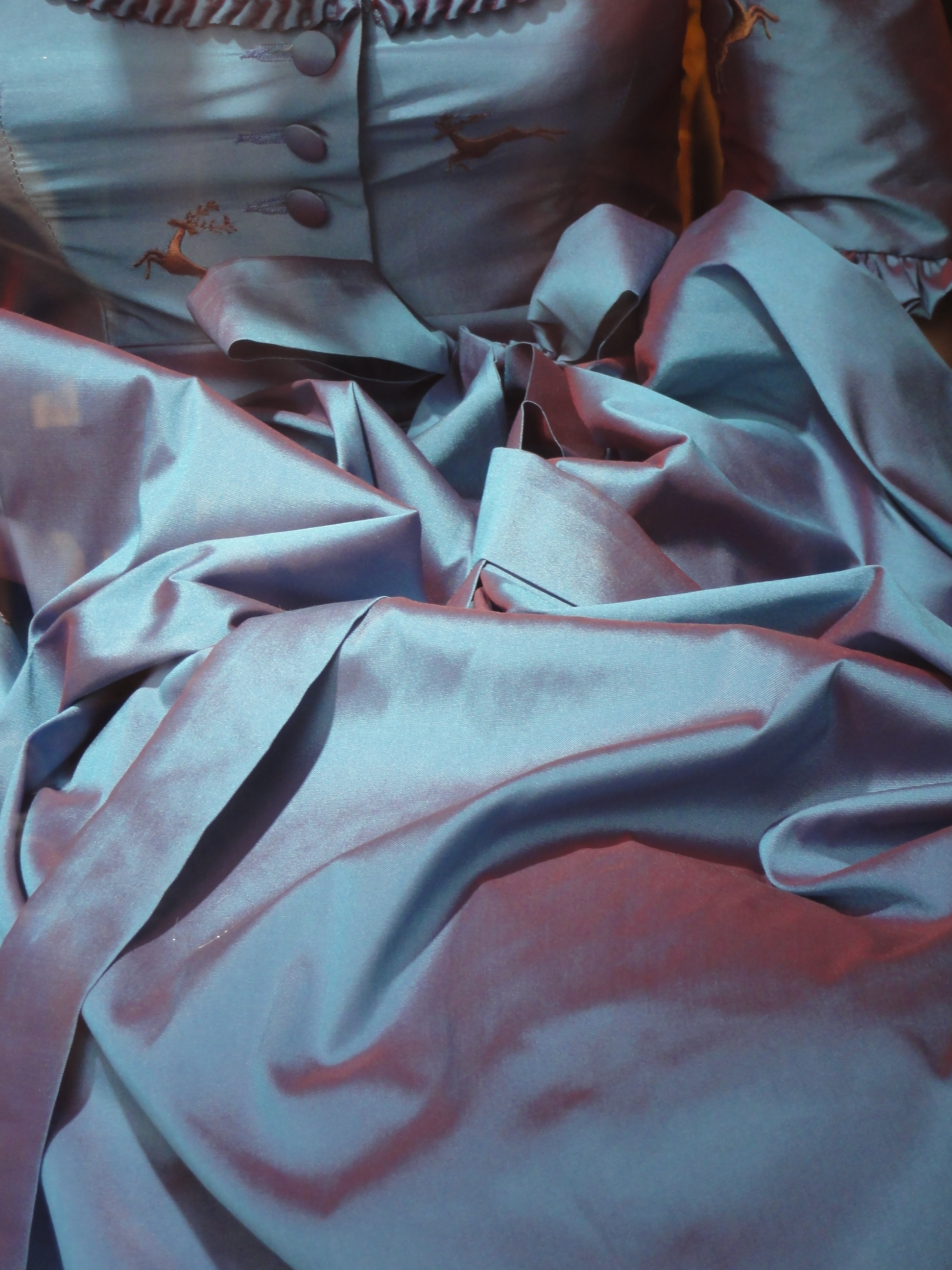
Shot silk with a blue warp and pink weft.

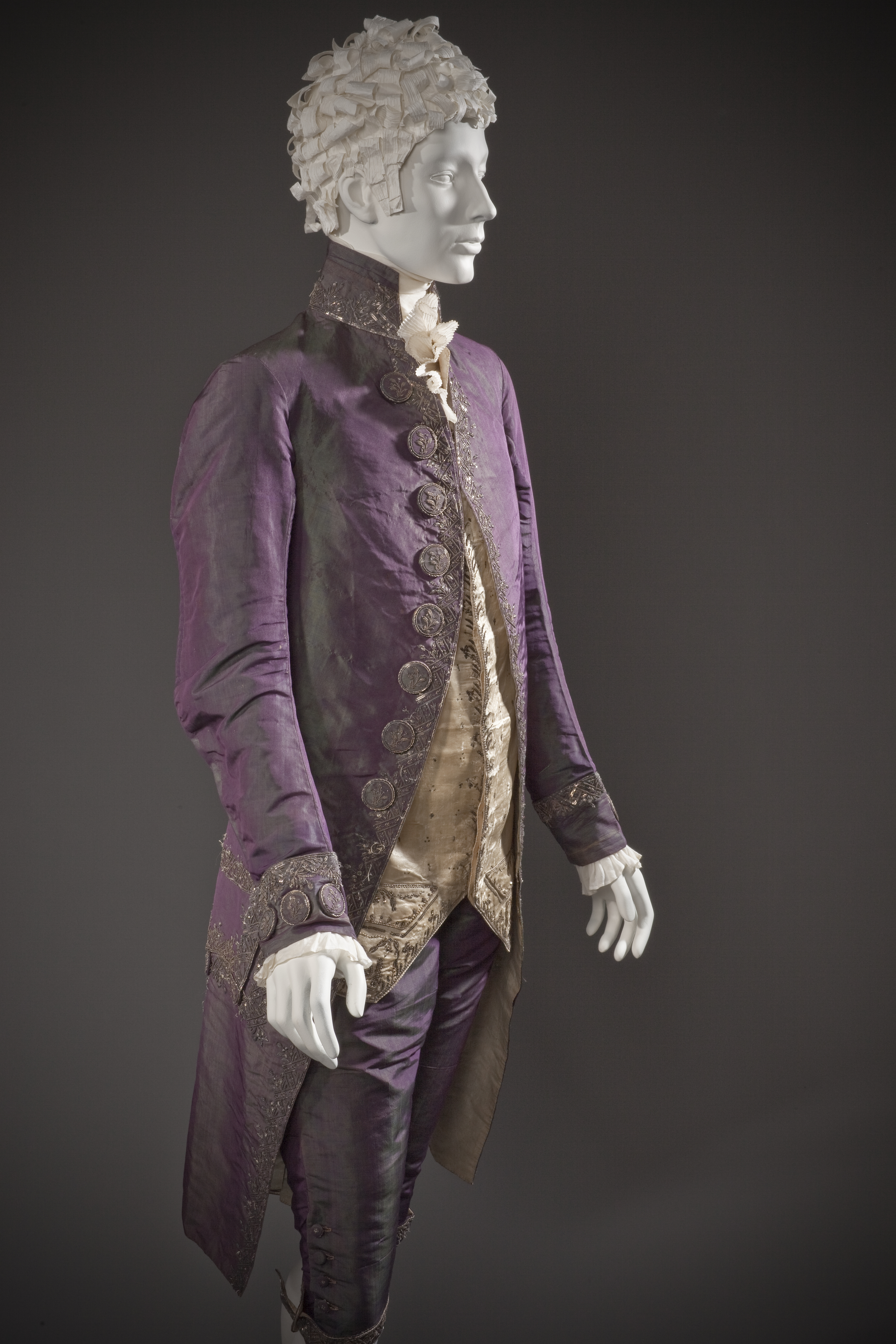
Man's shot silk suit, purple warp and green weft, c. 1790 (altered c. 1805). Los Angeles County Museum of Art.

Shot silk (also called changeant, changeable silk, changeable taffeta, cross-color, changeable fabric, or dhoop chaon (lit. "sunshine (and) shade")) is a fabric which is made up of silk woven from warp and weft yarns of two or more colours producing an iridescent appearance. A "shot" is a single throw of the bobbin that carries the weft thread through the warp, and shot silk colours can be described as "[warp colour] shot with [weft colour]." The weaving technique can also be applied to other fibres, such as cotton, linen, and synthetics.

== History ==
A shot silk vestment of purple and yellow, dating from about 698, is described in detail in a document written in about 1170, showing that the technique has existed since at least the 7th century. An argument has been made that shot silk was also described as purpura at this time. The Latin word mainly applied to purple, although there are multiple references to purpura being red, green, and black-and-red, as well as "varied". Purpura is also used to mean iridescence and the play of light, and medieval descriptions exist indicating that the textile purpura was a type of silk, distinct from other silks, in assorted colours. It has also been suggested that illuminations in the Lindisfarne Gospels of c.700 show garments of shot silk being worn by the Four Evangelists.

Shot silks were popular in the 18th and 19th centuries, including variants utilising warp printing, where the warp was printed before weaving, to create chiné or "Pompadour taffeta".

== Current use ==
Shot silks are used today to make various kinds of garments, including ball gowns and neckties. Notably, some forms of academic dress use shot silks, such as those of the University of Wales and the University of Cambridge. For example, the robes of a Cambridge Doctor of Divinity are faced with "dove" silk, which is turquoise shot with rose-pink, to create an overall grey effect.

== See also ==
- Sharkskin
